= Options strategy =

Type of trading strategy using options

Option strategies are the simultaneous, and often mixed, buying or selling of one or more options that differ in one or more of the options' variables. Call options, simply known as Calls, give the buyer a right to buy a particular stock at that option's strike price. Opposite to that are Put options, simply known as Puts, which give the buyer the right to sell a particular stock at the option's strike price. This is often done to gain exposure to a specific type of opportunity or risk while eliminating other risks as part of a trading strategy. A very straightforward strategy might simply be the buying or selling of a single option; however, option strategies often refer to a combination of simultaneous buying and or selling of options.

Options strategies allow traders to profit from movements in the underlying assets based on market sentiment (i.e., bullish, bearish or neutral). In the case of neutral strategies, they can be further classified into those that are bullish on volatility, measured by the lowercase Greek letter sigma (σ), and those that are bearish on volatility. Traders can also profit off time decay, measured by the uppercase Greek letter theta (Θ), when the stock market has low volatility. The option positions used can be long and/or short positions in calls and puts.

== Bullish strategies ==
Bullish options strategies are employed when the options trader expects the underlying stock price to move upwards. They can also use Theta (time decay) with a bullish/bearish combo called a Calendar Spread, when sideways movement is expected. The trader may also forecast how high the stock price may go and the time frame in which the rally may occur in order to select the optimum trading strategy for buying a bullish option.

The most bullish of options trading strategies, used by most options traders, is simply buying a call option.

The market is always moving. It's up to the trader to figure out what strategy fits the markets for that time period. Moderately bullish options traders usually set a target price for the bull run and utilize bull spreads to reduce cost or eliminate risk altogether. There is limited risk trading options by using the appropriate strategy. While maximum profit is capped for some of these strategies, they usually cost less to employ for a given nominal amount of exposure. There are options that have unlimited potential to the up or down side with limited risk if done correctly. The bull call spread and the bull put spread are common examples of moderately bullish strategies.

Mildly bullish trading strategies are options that make money as long as the underlying asset price does not decrease to the strike price by the option's expiration date. These strategies may provide downside protection as well. Writing out-of-the-money covered calls is a good example of such a strategy. The purchaser of the covered call is paying a premium for the option to purchase, at the strike price (rather than the market price), the assets you already own. This is how traders hedge a stock that they own when it has gone against them for a period of time.

== Bearish strategies ==
Bearish options strategies are employed when the options trader expects the underlying stock price to move downwards. It is necessary to assess how low the stock price can go and the time frame in which the decline will happen in order to select the optimum trading strategy. Selling a Bearish option is also another type of strategy that gives the trader a "credit". This does require a margin account.

The most bearish of options trading strategies is the simple put buying or selling strategy utilized by most options traders.

The market can make steep downward moves. Moderately bearish options traders usually set a target price for the expected decline and utilize bear spreads to reduce cost. This strategy has limited profit potential, but significantly reduces risk when done correctly. The bear call spread and the bear put spread are common examples of moderately bearish strategies.

Mildly bearish trading strategies are options strategies that make money as long as the underlying asset does not rise to the strike price by the options expiration date. However, you can add more options to the current position and move to a more advanced position that relies on Time Decay "Theta". These strategies may provide a small upside protection as well. In general, bearish strategies yield profit with less risk of loss.

== Neutral or non-directional strategies ==
Neutral strategies in options trading are employed when the options trader does not know whether the underlying asset's price will rise or fall. Also known as non-directional strategies, they are so named because the potential to profit does not depend on whether the underlying price will increase or decrease. Rather, the correct neutral strategy to employ depends on the expected volatility of the underlying stock price.

Examples of neutral strategies are:

- Guts - buy (long gut) or sell (short gut) a pair of ITM (in the money) put and call (compared to a strangle where OTM puts and calls are traded).
- Butterfly - a neutral option strategy combining bull and bear spreads. Long butterfly spreads use four option contracts with the same expiration but three different strike prices to create a range of prices the strategy can profit from.
- Straddle - an options strategy in which the investor holds a position in both a call and put with the same strike price and expiration date, paying both premiums (long straddle). ATM straddle can be used for earnings when you are anticipating that the underlying stock will move in a direction by an extent that exceeds the total to purchase both options.
- Strangle - where you buy a put below the stock and a call above the stock, with profit if the stock moves outside of either strike price (long strangle). Strangle can be either long or short. In short strangle, you'll get profit if the stock or index remains within the two short strikes. Likewise, in long strangle, you'll get profit if underlying stock or index moves out of the range of two strikes.
- Risk reversal - simulates the motion of an underlying so sometimes these are referred as synthetic long or synthetic short positions depending on which position you are shorting.
- Collar - buy the underlying and then simultaneous buying of a put option below current price (floor) and selling a call option above the current price (cap).
- Condor – combination of two vertical spreads, similar to a butterfly but with a range of underlying values yielding the maximum profit. Possible risk of loss will be less in Condor compared to butterfly
- Fence - buy the underlying then simultaneous buying of options either side of the price to limit the range of possible returns.
- Iron butterfly - sell two overlapping credit vertical spreads but one of the verticals is on the call side and one is on the put side. The short strikes are the same. In terms of CVAR (conditional value at risk), Butterfly is a useful strategy for 0DTEs (same day expiration contracts) because CVAR is low compared to many other strategies.
- Iron condor - the simultaneous selling of a put credit spread and a call credit spread with the same expiration date and four different strikes. An iron condor can be thought of as selling a strangle and limiting your risk on both the Call and Put sides by buying a further out of the money Call and a further out of money Put, frequently referred to by traders as the wings.
- Calendar spread - the purchase of an option in one month and the simultaneous sale of an option at the same strike price (and underlying) in an earlier month, for a debit.
- Jelly roll - a combination of two calendar spreads, used to profit from changes in interest rates or dividends.

=== Bullish on volatility ===
Neutral trading strategies that are bullish on volatility profit when the underlying stock price experiences big moves upwards or downwards. They include the long straddle, long strangle, short condor (long Iron Condor), long butterfly, and long Calendar.

=== Bearish on volatility ===
Neutral trading strategies that are bearish on volatility profit when the underlying stock price experiences little or no movement. Such strategies include the short straddle, short strangle, ratio spreads, long condor, short butterfly, and short calendar.

== Options spread ==
Options spreads are the basic building blocks of many options trading strategies. A spread position is entered by buying and selling options of the same class on the same underlying security but with different strike prices or expiration dates. An option spread shouldn't be confused with a spread option. The three main classes of spreads are the horizontal spread, the vertical spread and the diagonal spread. They are grouped by the relationships between the strike price and expiration dates of the options involved -

- Vertical spreads, or money spreads, are spreads involving options of the same underlying security, same expiration month, but at different strike prices.
- Horizontal, calendar spreads, or time spreads are created using options of the same underlying security, same strike prices but with different expiration dates.
- Diagonal spreads are constructed using options of the same underlying security but different strike prices and expiration dates. They are called diagonal spreads because they are a combination of vertical and horizontal spreads.

Any spread that is constructed using calls can be referred to as a call spread, while a put spread is constructed using puts.

=== Bull and bear spreads ===
If a spread is designed to profit from a rise in the price of the underlying security, it is a bull spread. A bear spread is a spread where a favorable outcome is obtained when the price of the underlying security goes down.

=== Credit and debit spreads ===
If the premiums of the options sold is higher than the premiums of the options purchased, then a net credit is received when entering the spread. If the opposite is true, then a debit is taken. Spreads that are entered on a debit are known as debit spreads while those entered on a credit are known as credit spreads.

=== Ratio spreads and backspreads ===
There are also spreads in which unequal number of options are simultaneously purchased and written. When more options are written than purchased, it is a ratio spread. When more options are purchased than written, it is a backspread.

=== Spread combinations ===
Many options strategies are built around spreads and combinations of spreads. For example, a bull put spread is a bull spread that is also a credit spread; the iron butterfly can be broken down into a combination of a bull put spread and a bear call spread; the iron condor is a combination of a put spread and a call spread with the same expiration and four different strikes; and the jelly roll is a long calendar spread and a short calendar spread at the same strike price.

=== Box spread ===
A box spread consists of a bull call spread and a bear put spread. The calls and puts are on the same underlying and have the same expiration date. The resulting portfolio is delta neutral. For example, a 40-50 January 2010 box consists of:

- Long a January 2010 40-strike call
- Short a January 2010 50-strike call
- Long a January 2010 50-strike put
- Short a January 2010 40-strike put

Barring early exercise on American-style legs, a box spread position, constructed with European-style options, has a constant payoff at exercise equal to the difference in strike values. Thus, at exercise, the 40-50 box example above pays +10 long or -10 short. For this reason, a box is sometimes considered a "pure interest rate play" because buying one basically constitutes lending some money to the counterparty until exercise.

Box spreads can be used as a financing or cash management tool, as institutional market participants have for decades. However, improperly structured box spreads using American options can expose investors to low-probability, extremely-high severity risk: if the options are exercised early, they can incur a loss much greater than the expected gain. To streamline execution and curb early-exercise risk, fintech firms have begun rolling out automated box-spread solutions, from financing platforms like SyntheticFi to cash-management offerings from Alpha Architect.

== Option strategy profit / loss chart ==
A typical option strategy involves the purchase / selling of at least 2-3 different options (with different strikes and / or time to expiry), and the value of such portfolio may change in a very complex way.

One very useful way to analyze and understand the behavior of a certain option strategy is by drawing its Profit graph.

An option strategy profit / loss graph shows the dependence of the profit / loss on an option strategy at different base asset price levels and at different moments in time.

== Option strategy payoff graphs ==
Following Black-Scholes option pricing model, the option's payoff, delta, and gamma (option greeks) can be investigated as time progress to maturity:

Payoff, delta, and gamma of a call option

Payoff, delta, and gamma of a put option

Payoff, delta, and gamma of a collar strategy

Payoff, delta, and gamma of a bull spread

Payoff, delta, and gamma of a bear spread

Payoff, delta, and gamma of a straddle strategy

Payoff, delta, and gamma of a butterfly strategy

== Profit charts ==
These are examples of charts that show the profit of the strategy as the price of the underlying varies.

Straddle

Short straddle

Butterfly (options strategy)

== See also ==
- Barrier option
- Binary option
- Chicago Board Options Exchange
- Options arbitrage
- Options spread
- Synthetic position
