= Ladder (option combination) =

Combination of three options in finance

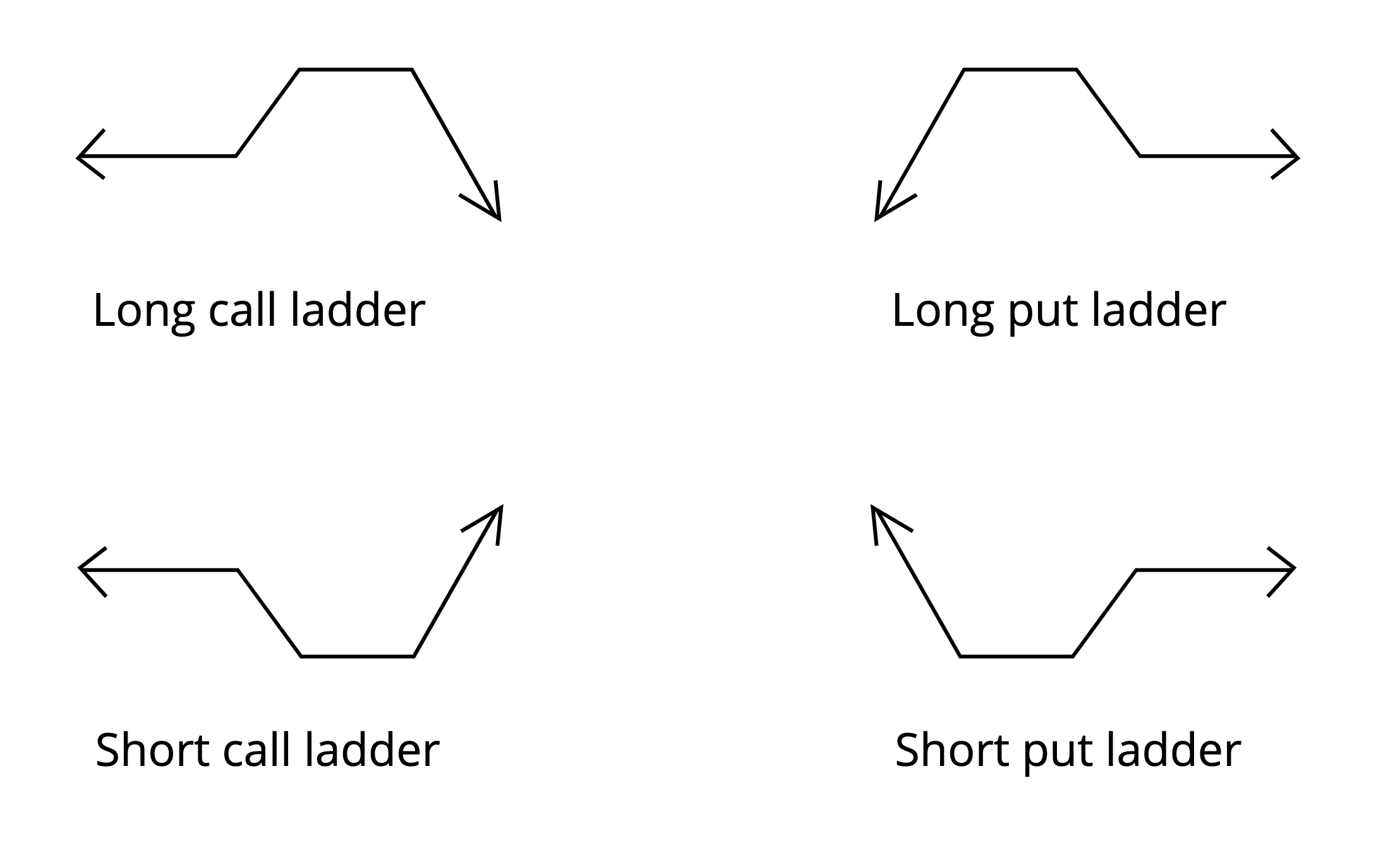
Simple payoff diagrams of the four types of ladder

In finance, a ladder, also known as a Christmas tree, is a combination of three options of the same type (all calls or all puts) at three different strike prices. A long ladder is used by traders who expect low volatility, while a short ladder is used by traders who expect high volatility. Ladders are in some ways similar to strangles, vertical spreads, condors, or ratio spreads.

A long call ladder consists of buying a call at one strike price and selling a call at each of two higher strike prices, while a long put ladder consists of buying a put at one strike price and selling a put at each of two lower strike prices. A short ladder is the opposite position, in which one option is sold and the other two are bought. Often, the strike prices are chosen to make the ladder delta neutral. All three options must have the same expiry date.

The term ladder is also used for an unrelated type of exotic option, and the term Christmas tree is also used for an unrelated option combination similar to a butterfly.

== Examples ==
For example, a trader might construct a long call ladder by buying one call with a strike price of 90, selling one call with a strike price of 95, and selling another call with a strike price of 105, all expiring on the same date. This would yield a limited loss if the options expire with the underlying near or below 90, a large loss if the options expire with the underlying far above 105, and a limited profit if the underlying is near or between 95 and 105.

A trader might construct a long put ladder by buying one put with a strike price of 110, selling one put with a strike price of 105, and selling another put with a strike price of 95 (again, all expiring on the same date). This would yield a limited loss if the options expire with the underlying near or above 110, a large loss if the options expire with the underlying far below 95, and a limited profit if the underlying is near or between 95 and 105.

A short ladder is the opposite position of a long ladder. Thus, for the first example above, the corresponding short call ladder would involve selling a 90 call, buying a 95 call, and buying a 105 call. For the second example, the corresponding short put ladder would involve selling a 110 put, buying a 105 put, and buying a 95 put.

== Terminology ==
The different types of ladders have alternative names:

- A long call ladder is also called a bull call ladder.
- A short call ladder is also called a bear call ladder.
- A long put ladder is also called a bear put ladder.
- A short put ladder is also called a bull put ladder.

A ladder can be seen as a modification of a bull spread or a bear spread with an additional option: for instance, a bear call ladder is equivalent to a bear call spread with an additional long call. A bull put ladder is equivalent to a bull put spread with an additional long put. These terms can be confusing, as they do not correspond to the usual concepts of "bullish" and "bearish" in finance. For instance, a bear call ladder is in fact an overall bullish strategy.

== Characteristics ==
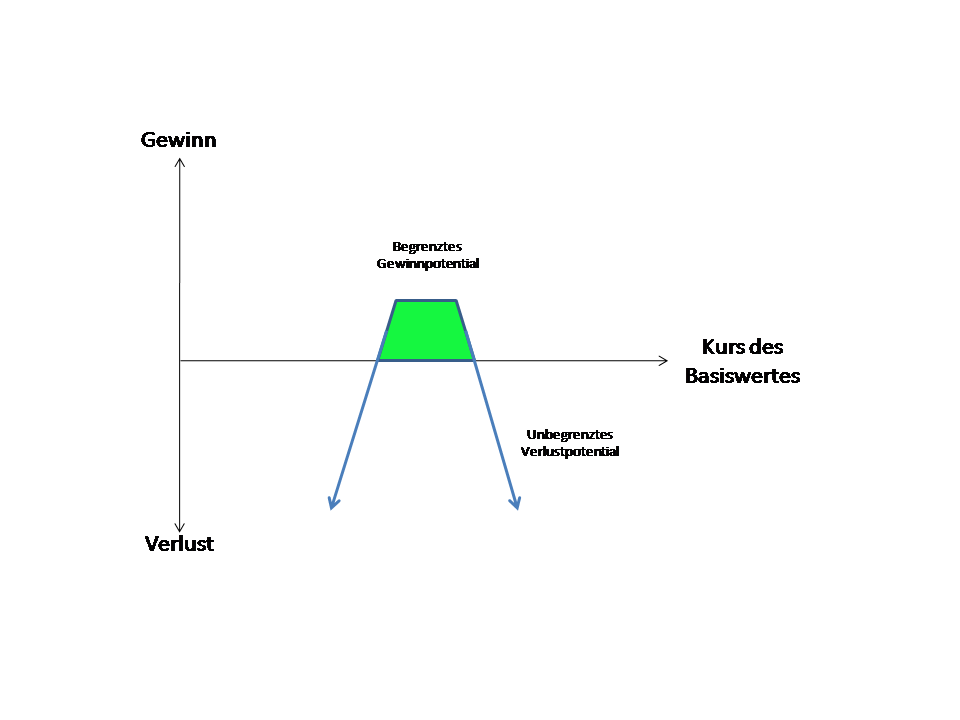
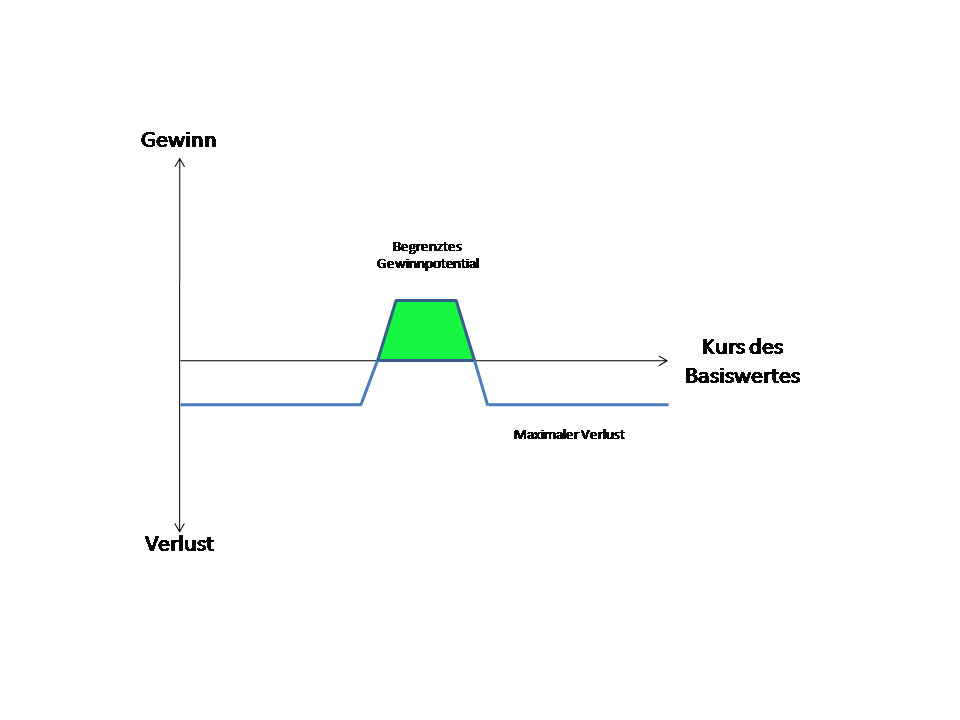
A long ladder is similar to a short strangle (above) and to a long condor (below).

A long ladder is similar to a short strangle but with limited risk in one direction (the downside for a call ladder and the upside for a put ladder), while a short ladder is similar to a long strangle but with limited profit potential in one direction (again, the downside for a call ladder and the upside for a put ladder). A ladder is also similar to a condor, the key difference being that a condor has an additional option; for example, a long call condor is similar to a long call ladder but with an extra call at a higher strike.

A ladder's Greeks are generally similar to a strangle. Generally, a short ladder is long gamma, short theta, and long vega, while a long ladder is short gamma, long theta, and short vega. A short ladder has limited risk and unlimited potential profit, while a long ladder has unlimited risk and limited potential profit.

A ladder has two break-even points.

== Execution ==
Because a ladder is a somewhat complex spread, it may not be listed directly on electronic exchanges, so traders wishing to trade one may need to make two or three transactions to construct the position, or communicate with a broker or market maker to specify the desired trade.
