= Condor (options) =

Options trading strategy

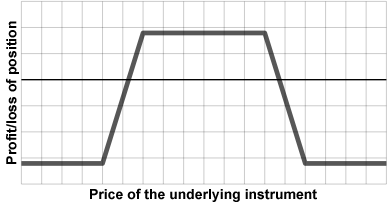
Example payoff diagram of a long condor: at expiry, if the underlying is at a high or low value, the buyer of the condor loses the premium, but if the underlying is at a value near or between the inner strikes, the buyer makes a profit.

A condor is a limited-risk, non-directional options trading strategy consisting of four options at four different strike prices. The buyer of a condor earns a profit if the underlying is between or near the inner two strikes at expiry, but has a limited loss if the underlying is near or outside the outer two strikes at expiry. Therefore, long condors are used by traders who expect the underlying to stay within a limited range (low volatility), while short condors are used by traders who expect the underlying to make a large move in either direction. Compared to a butterfly, a condor is profitable at a wider range of potential underlying values, but has a higher premium and therefore a lower maximum profit.

A long condor consists of four options of the same type (all calls or all puts). The options at the outer strikes are bought and the inner strikes are sold (and the reverse is done for a short condor). The difference between the two lowest strikes must be the same as the difference between the two highest strikes. All four options must have the same underlying and the same expiry date.

At expiry, a condor's value will be somewhere between 0 and the difference between the two higher (or two lower) strike prices. It achieves its maximum profit if the underlying is between the two inner strike prices at expiry, and it expires worthless if the underlying is outside the two outer strike prices (in the latter case the buyer's loss is the premium paid to enter the position). A long condor has a positive theta when the underlying is near the inner strikes, but a negative theta when the underlying is near the outer strikes.

A condor can be thought of as a spread of two vertical spreads, as a modification of a strangle with limited risk, or as a modification of a butterfly where the options in the body have different strike prices. A condor is also known as a "stretched butterfly", as its maximum profit is reached on a wider range of underlying prices compared to a butterfly. Both butterflies and condors are known as "wingspreads".

The condor is so named because of its payoff diagram's perceived resemblance to a large bird such as a condor.

An iron condor is a strategy which replicates the payoff of a short condor, but with a different combination of options.

== See also ==
- Ladder (option combination)
