= Debit spread =

Financial term

In finance, a debit spread, a.k.a. net debit spread, results when an investor simultaneously buys an option with a higher premium and sells an option with a lower premium. The investor is said to be a net buyer and expects the premiums of the two options (the options spread) to widen.

== Bullish & Bearish Debit Spreads ==
Investors want debit spreads to widen for profit.

A bullish debit spread can be constructed using calls. See bull call spread.

A bearish debit spread can be constructed using puts. See bear put spread.

A bull-bear phase spread can be constructed using near month call & put.

== Breakeven Point ==
- Breakeven for call spreads = lower strike + net premium
- Breakeven for put spreads = higher strike - net premium

== Maximum Potential ==
The maximum gain and loss potential are the same for call and put debit spreads. Note that net debit = difference in premiums.

=== Maximum Gain ===
Maximum gain = difference in strike prices - net debit, realized when both options are in-the-money.

=== Maximum Loss ===
Maximum loss = net debit, realized when both options expire worthless.

== See also ==
- Credit spread (option)
