= Diagonal spread =

Financial derivatives trading strategy

In derivatives trading, the term diagonal spread is applied to an options spread position that shares features of both a calendar spread and a vertical spread. It is established by simultaneously buying and selling equal amount of option contracts of the same type (call options or put options) but with different strike prices and expiration dates.

A diagonal spread differs from a pure calendar spread in that the strike prices are not the same, and from a pure vertical spread in that the expiration dates are not the same. Many diagonal spreads are constructed one-to-one (one long-term option for each short-term option), but they can also be created with unequal numbers of long and short market contracts (ratioed spreads). Due to the large number of possible variations, each diagonal spread must be analyzed individually to determine its risk and reward profile.

When a diagonal spread is constructed one-to-one, with both options having approximately the same delta, it behaves much like a conventional calendar spread. In this case, the position tends to be close to delta-neutral, with its profit or loss driven mainly by changes in volatility and the passage of time, rather than directional movement of the underlying.

== Example ==
Consider a diagonal spread established with the following positions:

- Buy 1 June 115 call at 2.20 (delta ≈ +0.23)
- Sell 1 April 110 call at 1.60 (delta ≈ +0.23)
- Buy 1 June 80 put at 0.72 (delta ≈ −0.08)
- Sell 1 April 85 put at 0.48 (delta ≈ −0.08)

Here, the expirations differ (June vs. April) and the strikes differ within each call and put pair, creating the "diagonal" structure. Because the deltas offset, the position is initially delta-neutral, with gains or losses driven primarily by volatility changes (vega) and time decay (theta).
