= Short calendar =

Short calendar could refer to:

- The 260 day ritual calendars used by several Mesoamerican civilisations
  - Tzolkʼin, the version used by the Maya
  - Tōnalpōhualli, the version used by the Mexica
- Short cause in legal proceedings
  - Season 1, episode 2 of Judging Amy, a legal drama
- A short calendar spread, a financial trade on futures or options which are expected to fall in value
