= Rollover =

Rollover or roll over may refer to:

== Arts and entertainment ==
- Rollover (film), a 1981 American political thriller
- Roll Over, a 1992 album by Hound Dog
- "Roll Over", a 2006 song by Zico Chain
- "Roll Over", a 1989 song by Steven Wayne Horton
- "Roll Over" (Thompson Twins song), 1985

== Computing and electronics ==
- Rollover, the act of a counter restarting its count sequence upon overflow or underflow
- Rollover (key), the ability of a computer keyboard to handle several simultaneous keystrokes
- Rollover cable, a cable used to connect a computer to a router

== Finance ==
- Rollover (finance)
- Rollover (foreign exchange)
- Rollover IRA, a type of individual retirement account in the U.S.

== Other uses ==
- Rollover (fire), a stage of a structure fire
- Rollover, the former name of Gilchrist, Texas, U.S.
  - Rollover Pass
- Roll Over, a park ride by Mondial (amusement ride manufacturer)
- Dynamic rollover, a helicopter's susceptibility to roll when close to the ground
- Vehicle rollover, a type of vehicular crash in which a vehicle tips over onto its side or roof

== See also ==
- Roll (disambiguation)
- "Roll Over Beethoven", a 1956 song by Chuck Berry
- Integer overflow, when an arithmetic operation attempts to create a numeric value that is outside of the range that can be represented with a given number of digits
