= Rollover (foreign exchange) =

Foreign exchange trading

In foreign exchange trading (FX), a rollover is the action taking place at end of day, where all open positions with value date equals SPOT, will be rolled over to the next business day. This happens since in FX trading the trader doesn't want to actually buy the traded currencies but to continue to trade until position is closed. For example, on Monday all position with value date of Wednesday (in case of T+2) will be rolled over and the value date will be updated for Thursday. Position with value date of Friday will be updated with value date of next Monday.

Trading platforms offer rollovers but the process involves a rollover interest fee which is calculated according to the difference between the interest rates of the traded currencies. If the interest rate on the trader's long position is higher than the rate on the short position, the trader receives the interest. If the interest rate on the trader's short position is higher than the rate on the long position, then the trader pays the interest. For weekends and holidays, the rollover is multiplied by the number of days of rollover.

== Calculation ==
The calculation is based on the difference between base and quote currencies. Thus, it is needed to subtract the interest rate of the base currency from the quote currency's interest rate. Then, it is needed to divide the result by 365 times the base exchange rate.

However, usually, the rollover is shown in the trading platform or on the broker's website, which frees the trader from unnecessary calculations. Rollover is also known as a swap fee. Thus, to check the rollover, it is needed to find a swap (long and short) on the broker's website or in the trading platform.

== See also ==
- Refinancing
