= Collar (finance) =

Stock options trading strategy

In finance, a collar is an option strategy that limits the range of possible positive or negative returns on an underlying to a specific range. A collar strategy is used as one of the ways to hedge against possible losses and it represents long put options financed with short call options. The collar combines the strategies of the protective put and the covered call.

== Equity collar ==
=== Structure ===
A collar is created by:

- buying the underlying asset
- buying a put option at strike price, X (called the floor)
- selling a call option at strike price, X + a (called the cap).

These latter two are a short risk reversal position. So:

Underlying − risk reversal = Collar

The premium income from selling the call reduces the cost of purchasing the put. The amount saved depends on the strike price of the two options.

Most commonly, the two strikes are roughly equal distances from the current price. For example, an investor would insure against loss more than 20% in return for giving up gain more than 20%. In this case the cost of the two options should be roughly equal. In case the premiums are exactly equal, this may be called a zero-cost collar; the return is the same as if no collar was applied, provided that the ending price is between the two strikes.

On expiry the value (but not the profit) of the collar will be:

- X if the price of the underlying is below X
- the value of the underlying if the underlying is between X and X + a, inclusive
- X + a, if the underlying is above X + a.

=== Example ===
Consider an investor who owns 100 shares of a stock with a current share price of $5. An investor could construct a collar by buying one put with a strike price of $3 and selling one call with a strike price of $7. The collar would ensure that the gain on the portfolio will be no higher than $2 and the loss will be no worse than $2 (before deducting the net cost of the put option; i.e., the cost of the put option less what is received for selling the call option).

There are three possible scenarios when the options expire:

- If the stock price is above the $7 strike price on the call he wrote, the person who bought the call from the investor will exercise the purchased call; the investor effectively sells the shares at the $7 strike price. This would lock in a $2 profit for the investor. He only makes a $2 profit (minus fees), no matter how high the share price goes. For example, if the stock price goes up to $11, the buyer of the call will exercise the option and the investor will sell the shares that he bought at $5 for $11, for a $6 profit, but must then pay out $11 – $7 = $4, making his profit only $2 ($6 − $4). The premium paid for the put must then be subtracted from this $2 profit to calculate the total return on this investment.
- If the stock price drops below the $3 strike price on the put then the investor may exercise the put and the person who sold it is forced to buy the investor's 100 shares at $3. The investor loses $2 on the stock but can lose only $2 (plus fees) no matter how low the price of the stock goes. For example, if the stock price falls to $1 then the investor exercises the put and has a $2 gain. The value of the investor's stock has fallen by $5 – $1 = $4. The call expires worthless (since the buyer does not exercise it) and the total net loss is $2 – $4 = −$2. The premium received for the call must then be added to reduce this $2 loss to calculate the total return on this investment.
- If the stock price is between the two strike prices on the expiry date, both options expire unexercised and the investor is left with the 100 shares whose value is that stock price (×100), plus the cash gained from selling the call option, minus the price paid to buy the put option, minus fees.

One source of risk is counterparty risk. If the stock price expires below the $3 floor then the counterparty may default on the put contract, thus creating the potential for losses up to the full value of the stock (plus fees).

== Interest rate collar ==
=== Structure ===
In an interest rate collar, the investor seeks to limit exposure to changing interest rates and at the same time lower its net premium obligations. Hence, the investor goes long on the cap (floor) that will save it money for a strike of X +(-) S1 but at the same time shorts a floor (cap) for a strike of X +(-) S2 so that the premium of one at least partially offsets the premium of the other. Here S1 is the maximum tolerable unfavorable change in payable interest rate and S2 is the maximum benefit of a favorable move in interest rates.

=== Example ===
Consider an investor who has an obligation to pay floating 6 month LIBOR annually on a notional N and which (when invested) earns 6%. A rise in LIBOR above 6% will hurt said investor, while a drop will benefit him. Thus, it is desirable for him to purchase an interest rate cap which will pay him back in the case that the LIBOR rises above his level of comfort. Figuring that he is comfortable paying up to 7%, he buys an interest rate cap contract from a counterparty, where the counterparty will pay him the difference between the 6 month LIBOR and 7% when the LIBOR exceeds 7% for a premium of 0.08N. To offset this premium, he also sells an interest rate floor contract to a counterparty, where he will have to pay the difference between the 6 month LIBOR and 5% when the LIBOR falls below 5%. For this he receives a 0.075N premium, thus offsetting what he paid for the cap contract.

Now, he can face 3 scenarios:

1. Rising interest rates - he will pay a maximum of 7% on his original obligation. Anything over and above that will be offset by the payments he will receive under the cap agreement. Hence, the investor is not exposed to interest rate increases exceeding 1%.
2. Stationary interest rates - neither contract triggers, nothing happens
3. Falling interest rates - he will benefit from a fall in interest rates down to 5%. If they fall further, the investor will have to pay the difference under the floor agreement, while of course saving the same amount on the original obligation. Hence, the investor is not exposed to interest falls exceeding 1%.

== Rationale ==
In times of high volatility, or in bear markets, it can be useful to limit the downside risk to a portfolio. One obvious way to do this is to sell the stock. In the above example, if an investor just sold the stock, the investor would get $5. This may be fine, but it poses additional questions. Does the investor have an acceptable investment available to put the money from the sale into? What are the transaction costs associated with liquidating the portfolio? Would the investor rather just hold on to the stock? What are the tax consequences?

If it makes more sense to hold on to the stock (or other underlying asset), the investor can limit that downside risk that lies below the strike price on the put in exchange for giving up the upside above the strike price on the call. Another advantage is that the cost of setting up a collar is (usually) free or nearly free. The price received for selling the call is used to buy the put—one pays for the other.

Finally, using a collar strategy takes the return from the probable to the definite. That is, when an investor owns a stock (or another underlying asset) and has an expected return, that expected return is only the mean of the distribution of possible returns, weighted by their probability. The investor may get a higher or lower return. When an investor who owns a stock (or other underlying asset) uses a collar strategy, the investor knows that the return can be no higher than the return defined by strike price on the call, and no lower than the return that results from the strike price of the put.

=== Symmetric collar ===
A symmetric collar is one where the initial value of each leg is equal. The product has therefore no cost to enter.

=== Structured collar ===
A structured collar describes an interest rate derivative product consisting of a straightforward cap, and an enhanced floor. The enhancement consists of additions which increase the cost of the floor should it be breached, or other adjustments designed to increase its cost. It can be contrasted with a symmetric collar, where the value of the cap and floor are equal. It attracted criticism as part of the Financial Conduct Authorities' review of mis-sold bank interest rate products.
