= Backspread =

Options trading strategy

In options trading, the backspread is the converse strategy to the ratio spread and is also known as the reverse ratio spread. Using calls, a bullish strategy known as the call backspread can be constructed and with puts, a strategy known as the put backspread can be constructed.

== Call backspread ==
The call backspread (reverse call ratio spread) is a bullish strategy in options trading whereby the options trader writes a number of call options and buys more call options of the same underlying stock and expiration date but at a higher strike price. It is an unlimited profit, limited risk strategy that is used when the trader thinks that the price of the underlying stock will rise sharply in the near future.

A 2:1 call backspread can be created by selling a number of calls at a lower strike price and buying twice the number of calls at a higher strike.

== Put backspread ==
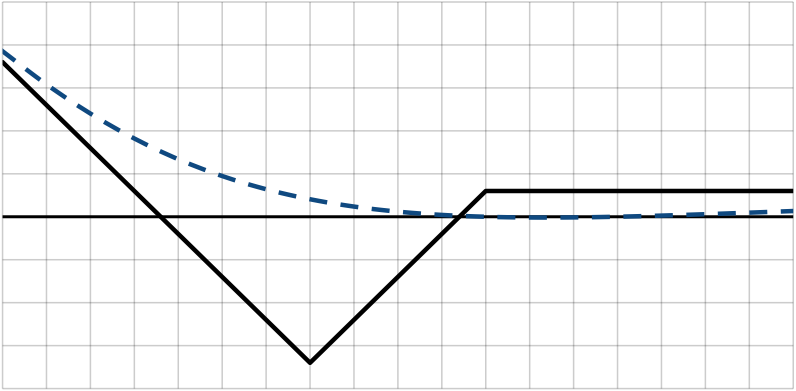
An example profit and loss graph for a Put Backspread options strategy placed at a net credit. The solid black line shows the combined value of the position at expiration. The dashed blue line shows the combined value of the position some time before expiration and when there exists significant implied volatility in the options.

The put backspread is a strategy in options trading whereby the options trader writes a number of put options at a higher strike price (often at-the-money) and buys a greater number (often twice as many) of put options at a lower strike price (often out-of-the-money) of the same underlying stock and expiration date. Typically the strikes are selected such that the cost of the long puts is largely offset by the premium earned in writing the at-the-money puts. This strategy is generally considered very bearish but it can also serve as a neutral/bullish play under the right conditions.

The maximum profit for this strategy is achieved when the price of the underlying security moves to zero before expiration of the options. Given these declarations:

$$\begin{align}
K_l & = \text{lower strike price} \\
K_u & = \text{upper strike price} \\
C_n & = \text{net credit per share} \\
N & = \text{number of shares per options contract}
\end{align}$$

The maximum profit per put backspread combination can be expressed as:

$\text{Maximum Profit} = \left[ K_u - 2 \times \left( K_u - K_l \right) + C_n \right] \times N$

The maximum upside profit is achieved if the price of the underlying is at or above the upper strike price at expiration and can be expressed simply as:

$\text{Maximum Profit (upside)} = C_n\,$

The maximum loss for this strategy is taken when the price of the underlying security moves to exactly the lower strike at expiration. The loss taken per put backspread combination can be expressed as:

$\text{Maximum Loss} = \left( C_n + K_l - K_u \right) \times N$

=== As a very bearish strategy ===
The maximum profit from this strategy is realised if the underlying moves to zero before the options expire. The maximum loss for this strategy is realised when, at expiration, the underlying has moved moderately bearishly to the price of the lower strike price. This strategy might be used when the trader believes that there will be a very sharp, downward move and would like to enter the position without paying a lot of premium, as the written puts will offset the cost of the purchased puts.

=== As a neutral/bullish strategy ===
The strategy can often be placed for a net credit when the net premium earned for the written puts minus the premium paid for the long puts is positive. In this case, this strategy can be considered a neutral or bullish play, since the net credit may be kept if the underlying remains at or greater than the upper strike price when the options expire.

==== The dynamics of The Greeks ====
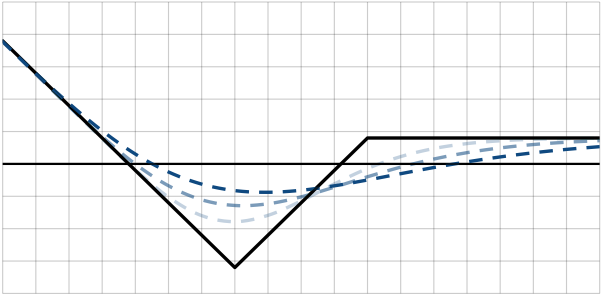
An illustration of the put backspread, placed for a net credit, showing the overall profit/loss of the position at expiry (solid black line) and sometime before expiry with different levels of implied volatility (dashed blue lines, darker = higher volatility)

This position has a complex profile in that the Greeks Vega and Theta affect the profitability of the position differently, depending on whether the underlying spot price is above or below the upper strike. When the underlying's price is at or above the upper strike, the position is short vega (the value of the position decreases as volatility increases) and long theta (the value of the position increases as time passes). When the underlying is below the upper strike price, it is long vega (the value of the position increases as volatility increases) and short theta (the value of the position decreases as time passes).

===== In equity markets =====
In equity options markets (including equity indexes and derivative equities such as ETFs, but possibly excluding inverse ETFs), it has been observed that there exists an inverse correlation between the price of the underlying and the implied volatility of its options. The implied volatility will often increase as the price of the underlying decreases and vice versa. This correlation manifests itself in a beneficial way to traders in a put backspread position.

Since this position is long vega when the underlying's price falls below the upper strike price, this position may offer some degree of protection to the equity options trader who did not desire a bearish move. As volatility increases so does the current value of the position which may allow the trader time to exit with reduced losses or even a small profit in some conditions. Since this position is short vega when the underlying is above the upper strike price, this dynamic is again helpful to the equity options trader.

For equity markets (as described above), the call backspread does not generally offer these helpful dynamics because the generally associated changes in volatility as price moves in the equity markets may exacerbate losses on a bearish move and reduce profits on a bullish move in the underlying.

===== In commodity futures markets =====
With options on commodity futures (and possibly inverse ETFs), this relationship may be reversed as the observed correlation between price movement and implied volatility is positive meaning that as prices rise, so does volatility. In this case, the call backspread trader might benefit from these effects and the put backspread trader might not.

== See also ==
- Options spread
