= Ratio spread =

Options trading strategy

A ratio spread or frontspread is a multi-leg options position. Like a vertical, the ratio spread involves buying and selling options on the same underlying security with different strike prices and the same expiration date. In this spread, the number of option contracts sold is not equal to a number of contracts bought. An unequal number of options contracts gives this spread certain unique properties compared to a regular vertical spread. A typical ratio spread would be where twice as many option contracts are sold, thus forming a 1:2 ratio.

== Purpose ==
Ideally, this strategy should be used when either A) the implied volatility of the options expiring in a particular month has recently moved sharply higher and is now beginning to decline, or B) the trader believes for whatever reason that the underlying market of the option(s) will move steadily in his favor during the life of the option. The trader will use call options in this strategy if they believe the underlying market will move steadily higher, and put options if they believe the market will move steadily lower.

In the case of call options, the trader will buy some number of options having striking price X and write (sell) a larger number of options having striking price Y, where Y is greater than X. In the case of put options, the trader will buy some number of options having striking price A, but write (sell) a larger number of options having striking price B, where B is less than A.

The "straight" ratio-spread describes this strategy if the trader buys and writes (sells) options having the same expiration. If, instead, the trader executes this strategy by buying options having expiration in one month but writing (selling) options having expiration in a different month, this is known as a ratio-diagonal trade.

As with all option spreads, the trader in a ratio-spread will strongly prefer to buy options having a distinctly lower implied volatility than the options they are writing (selling).

== See also ==
- Ladder (option combination)
- Options spread
- Backspread
