= Long cause =

A long cause is a case whose trial is expected to take longer than that of a short cause, which in most jurisdictions is defined to be one day. Court rules governing long cause cases vary by local area.

Cases will generally be identified as such on the law and motion calendar or on the case management calendar.

== See also ==
- Legal case
