= Risk reversal =

Concept in finance

In finance, risk reversal (also known as a conversion when an investment strategy) can refer to a measure of the volatility skew or to a trading strategy.

== Risk reversal investment strategy ==
A risk-reversal is an option position that consists of selling (that is, being short) an out of the money put and buying (i.e. being long) an out of the money call, both options expiring on the same expiration date.

In this strategy, the investor will first form their market view on a stock or an index; if that view is bullish they will want to go long. However, instead of going long on the stock, they will buy an out of the money call option, and simultaneously sell an out of the money put option, using the money from the sale of the put option to purchase the call option. Then as the stock goes up in price, the call option will be worth more, and the put option will be worth less.

A risk reversal position can simulate the profit and loss behavior of owning an underlying security; therefore it is sometimes called a synthetic long. This is an investment strategy that amounts to both buying and selling out-of-money options simultaneously.

== Risk reversal measure of vol-skew ==
Risk reversal can refer to the manner in which similar out-of-the-money call and put options, usually foreign exchange options, are quoted by finance dealers. Instead of quoting these options' prices, dealers quote their volatility.

$$R_{25} = \sigma _{call,25} - \sigma _{put,25}$$

In other words, for a given maturity, the 25 risk reversal is the vol of the 25 delta call less the vol of the 25 delta put. The 25 delta put is the put whose strike has been chosen such that the delta is -25%.

The greater the demand for an options contract, the greater its price and hence the greater its implied volatility. A positive risk reversal means the implied volatility of calls is greater than the implied volatility of similar puts, which implies a 'positively' skewed distribution of expected spot returns. This is composed of a relatively large number of small down moves along with the possibility of few but relatively large up moves.

== See also ==
- Options strategy
- Volatility risk

== Other external links ==
- Reuters description:
