= Law and motion calendar =

Calendar used in American Courts

Each judge or courtroom in the United States has a law and motion calendar, setting aside the times when only motions and special legal arguments are heard. These items consist of pretrial motions (such as a motion to compel relating to discovery requests) or other legal requests that are not connected to a trial, and do not include trials themselves.

== See also ==
- Legal case
- Long cause
- Short cause
