= Strangle (options) =

Financial options strategy

In finance, a strangle is an options strategy involving the purchase or sale of two options, allowing the holder to profit based on how much the price of the underlying security moves, with a neutral exposure to the direction of price movement. A strangle consists of one call and one put with the same expiry and underlying but different strike prices. Typically the call has a higher strike price than the put. If the put has a higher strike price instead, the position is sometimes called a guts.

If the options are purchased, the position is known as a long strangle, while if the options are sold, it is known as a short strangle. A strangle is similar to a straddle position; the difference is that in a straddle, the two options have the same strike price. Given the same underlying security, strangle positions can be constructed with a lower cost but lower probability of profit than straddles.

Payoffs of buying a strangle spread.

== Characteristics ==
Payoffs of short strangle

A strangle, (Note: Sometimes known in its short form as a top vertical combination, and in its long form as a bottom vertical combination.) requires the investor to simultaneously buy or sell both a call and a put option on the same underlying security. The strike prices for the call and put contracts are usually, respectively, above and below the current price of the underlying.

=== Long strangles ===
The owner of a long strangle profits if the underlying price moves far away from the current price, either above or below. Thus, an investor may take a long strangle position if they think the underlying security is highly volatile, but does not know which direction it is going to move. This position has limited risk, since the most a purchaser may lose is the cost of both options. At the same time, there is unlimited profit potential.

=== Short strangles ===
Short strangles have unlimited losses and limited potential gains; however, they have a high probability of being profitable. The assumption of the short seller is neutral, in that the seller would hope that the trade would expire worthless in-between the two contracts, thereby receiving their maximum profit. Short strangles exhibit asymmetrical risk profiles, with larger possible maximum losses observed than the maximum gains to the upside.

Active management may be required if a short strangle becomes unprofitable. If a strangle trade has gone wrong and has become biased in one direction, a seller might add additional puts or calls against the position, to restore their original neutral exposure. Another strategy to manage strangles could be to roll or close the position before expiration; as an example, strangles managed at 21 days-to-expiration are known to exhibit less negative tail risk, (Note: Tail risk is the risk associated with large moves in one direction.) and a lower standard deviation of returns. (Note: Standard Deviation is a measure of volatility.)

== See also ==
- Condor (options)
- Ladder (option combination)
