= Short cause =

If the parties to a legal case anticipate that it will not take up a significant amount of time, they may apply for the court to designate it as a short cause. Cases on the "short cause" calendar will get priority since they will not tie up a courtroom for a long time.

The time permitted for a short cause varies from one court to another, but usually will not exceed one day. Other traits include, e.g., usually no jury is used.

If a "short cause" lasts beyond its designated time limit, the judge may declare a mistrial and reset the case to be held later as a "long cause."

== California ==
California's Rules of Court provide:

Rule 3.735. Management of short cause cases

(a) Short cause case defined

A short cause case is a civil case in which the time estimated for trial by all parties or the court is five hours or less. All other civil cases are long cause cases.
(Subd (a) amended effective January 1, 2007.)

(b) Exemption for short cause case and setting of case for trial

The court may order, upon the stipulation of all parties or the court's own motion, that a case is a short cause case exempted from the requirements of case management review and set the case for trial.

(c) Mistrial

If a short cause case is not completely tried within five hours, the judge may declare a mistrial or, in the judge's discretion, may complete the trial. In the event of a mistrial, the case will be treated as a long cause case and must promptly be set either for a new trial or for a case management conference.

Rule 3.735 amended and renumbered effective January 1, 2007; adopted as rule 214 effective July 1, 2002.

== See also ==
- Law and motion calendar
- Long cause
