= Position (finance) =

Amount of a certain security, commodity or currency held or owned by a person/entity

In finance, a position is the amount of a particular security, commodity or currency held or owned by a person or entity.

In financial trading, a position in a futures contract does not reflect ownership but rather a binding commitment to buy or sell a given number of financial instruments, such as securities, currencies or commodities, for a given price.

== Trading and financial assets ==
In derivatives trading or for financial instruments, the concept of a position is used extensively. There are two basic types of position: a long (holding a positive amount of the instrument) and a short (holding a negative amount of the instrument). Generally speaking, long positions stand to gain from a rise of the price of the instrument and short positions from a fall (but with options the situation is more complicated).

Options will be used in the following explanations. The same principle applies for futures and other securities. For simplicity, only one contract is being traded in these examples.

=== Long position ===
- When a trader buys an option contract that they are not short, they are said to be opening a long position.
- When a trader sells an option contract that they are already long, they are said to be closing a long position.

=== Short position ===
- When a trader sells an option contract that they are not long, they are said to be opening a short position.
- When a trader buys an option contract that they are already short, they are said to be closing a short position.

=== Bull position ===
A trader holding a bull position will benefit when the price of the underlying goes up. This is equivalent to holding a long position on most financial instruments, but also a short position on put options, inverse ETFs or similar.

=== Bear position ===
A trader holding a bear position will benefit when the price of the underlying goes down. This is equivalent to holding a short position on most financial instruments, but also a long position on put options, inverse ETFs or similar.

=== Net position ===
Net position is the difference between total open long (receivable) and open short (payable) positions in a given asset (security, foreign exchange currency, commodity, etc.) held by an individual. This also refers to the amount of assets held by a person, firm, or financial institution, as well as the ownership status of a person's or institution's investments.

== See also ==
- Arbitrage
