= Straddle =

Options combination in finance

In finance, a straddle strategy involves two transactions in options on the same underlying, with opposite positions. One holds long risk, the other short. As a result, it involves the purchase or sale of particular option derivatives that allow the holder to profit based on how much the price of the underlying security moves, regardless of the direction of price movement.

A straddle involves buying a call and put with same strike price and expiration date in the same notional amounts. If the stock price is close to the strike price at expiration of the options, the straddle leads to a loss. However, if there is a sufficiently large move in either direction, a significant profit will result. A straddle is appropriate when an investor is expecting a large move in a stock price but does not know in which direction the move will be.

A straddle made from the purchase of options is known as a long straddle, bottom straddle, or straddle purchase, while the reverse position, made from the sale of the options, is known as a short straddle, top straddle, or straddle write.

== Long straddle ==
An option payoff diagram for a long straddle position

A long straddle involves "going long volatility", in other words purchasing both a call option and a put option on some stock, interest rate, index or other underlying. The two options are bought at the same strike price and expire at the same time. The owner of a long straddle makes a profit if the underlying price moves a long way from the strike price, either above or below. Thus, an investor may take a long straddle position if they think the market is more volatile than option prices suggest, but does not know in which direction it is going to move. This position is a limited risk, since the most a purchaser may lose is the cost of both options. At the same time, there is unlimited profit potential.

For example, company XYZ is set to release its quarterly financial results in two weeks. A trader believes that the release of these results will cause a large movement in the price of XYZ's stock, but does not know whether the price will go up or down. They can enter into a long straddle, where they get a profit no matter which way the price of XYZ stock moves, if the price changes enough either way. If the price goes up enough, they use the call option and ignore the put option. If the price goes down, they use the put option and ignore the call option. If the price does not change enough, they lose money, up to the total amount paid for the two options. The risk is limited by the total premium paid for the options, as opposed to the short straddle where the risk is virtually unlimited.

If the options are American, the stock is sufficiently volatile, and option duration is long, the trader could profit from both options. This would require the stock to move both below the put option's strike price and above the call option's strike price at different times before the option expiration date.

== Short straddle ==
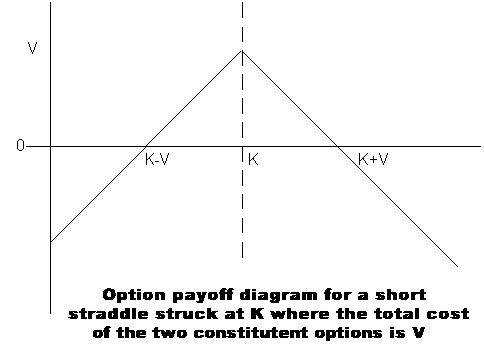

A short straddle is a non-directional options trading strategy that involves simultaneously selling a put and a call of the same underlying security, strike price and expiration date. The profit is limited to the premium received from the sale of put and call. The risk is virtually unlimited as large moves of the underlying security's price either up or down will cause losses proportional to the magnitude of the price move. A maximum profit upon expiration is achieved if the underlying security trades exactly at the strike price of the straddle. In that case both puts and calls comprising the straddle expire worthless allowing straddle owner to keep full credit received as their profit. This strategy is called "nondirectional" because the short straddle profits when the underlying security changes little in price before the expiration of the straddle. The short straddle can also be classified as a credit spread because the sale of the short straddle results in a credit of the premiums of the put and call.

The risk to a holder of a short straddle position is unlimited due to the sale of the call and the put options which expose the investor to unlimited losses (on the call) or losses limited to the strike price (on the put), whereas maximum profit is limited to the premium gained by the initial sale of the options. Losses from a short straddle trade placed by Nick Leeson were a key part of the collapse of Barings Bank.

== Straps and strips ==
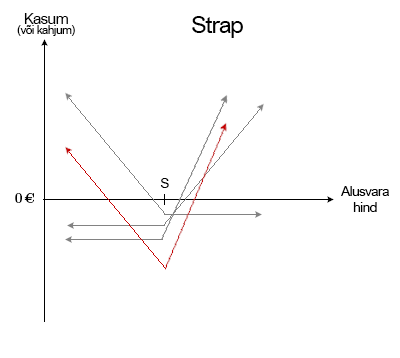
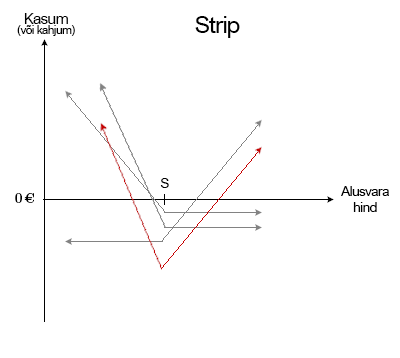
Rough example payoff diagrams of a strap (left) and a strip (right)

Straps and strips are modified versions of a straddle. Whereas a straddle consists of one put and one call at the same strike price, a strap consists of two calls and one put at the same strike price, while a strip consists of one call and two puts. Like a straddle, a strap or a strip allows the trader to profit from a large move in either direction, but while a straddle is directionally neutral, a strap is more bullish (used by a trader who considers an increase more likely than a decrease), and a strip is more bearish (used by a trader who considers a decrease more likely than an increase).

== See also ==
- Butterfly (options)
- Strangle (options)
