= Rolling (finance) =

Rolling a contract is an investment concept meaning trading out of a contract and then buying the contract with next longest maturity, so as to maintain a position with constant maturity.

== Motivation ==
One may roll a contract because one has a special preference for a specific maturity—for example, the five-year CDS rate of a given name—or because a given on-the-run security is more liquid than off-the-run securities.

== Examples ==
While holding US Treasuries, one may wish to hold only the most recently issued security of a given maturity, the so-called on-the-run security. Thus, if one has purchased the on-the-run 30-year treasury and a new 30-year auction occurs, one may sell the old treasury, which is now off-the-run, and purchase the new on-the-run treasury.

There is generally very high trading activity on these dates, as contracts whose maturity falls on them are rolled.

== Index roll congestion ==
When an index has a published policy for rolling its contracts, such as on a given day or over a given period, a trading strategy is to roll in advance of the index, in anticipation of its trading volume. This is referred to as index roll congestion.

== See also ==
- Jelly roll (options)
- Rollover (foreign exchange)
