= Calendar spread =

Type of stock options trading strategy

In finance, a calendar spread (also called a time spread or horizontal spread) is a spread trade involving the simultaneous purchase of futures or options expiring on a particular date and the sale of the same instrument expiring on another date. These individual purchases, known as the legs of the spread, vary only in expiration date; they are based on the same underlying market and strike price.

The usual case involves the purchase of futures or options expiring in a more distant month--the far leg--and the sale of futures or options in a more nearby month--the near leg.

== Uses ==
The calendar spread can be used to attempt to take advantage of a difference in the implied volatilities between two different months' options. The trader will ordinarily implement this strategy when the options they are buying have a distinctly lower implied volatility than the options they are writing (selling).

In the typical version of this strategy, a rise in the overall implied volatility of a market's options during the trade will tend very strongly to be to the trader's advantage, and a decline in implied volatility will tend strongly to work to the trader's disadvantage.

If the trader instead buys a nearby month's options in some underlying market and sells that same underlying market's further-out options of the same striking price, this is known as a reverse calendar spread. This strategy will tend strongly to benefit from a decline in the overall implied volatility of that market's options over time. The calendar spread is mostly neutral with regard to the price of the underlying. The short calendar spread has net negative theta.

== Futures pricing ==
Futures calendar spreads or switches represent simultaneous purchase and sales in different delivery months, and are quoted as the difference in prices. If gold for August delivery is bid $1601.20 asking $1601.30, and gold for October delivery is bid $1603.20 asking $1603.30, then the calendar spread would be bid -$2.10 asking -$1.90 for August–October.

Calendar spreads or switches are most often used in the futures markets to 'roll over' a position for delivery from one month into another month.

== Trading strategies ==
=== Pick expiration months as for a covered call ===
When trading a calendar spread, try to think of this strategy as a covered call. The only difference is that you do not own the underlying stock, but you do own the right to purchase it. By treating this trade like a covered call, it will help you pick expiration months quickly. When selecting the expiration date of the long option, it is wise to go at least two to three months out. This will depend largely on your forecast. However, when selecting the short strike, it is a good practice to always sell the shortest dated option available. These options lose value the fastest, and can be rolled out month-to-month over the life of the trade.

=== Leg into a calendar spread ===
For traders who own calls or puts against a stock, they can sell an option against this position and "leg" into a calendar spread at any point. For example, if you own calls on a particular stock and it has made a significant move to the upside but has recently leveled out, you can sell a call against this stock if you are neutral over the short term. Traders can use this legging-in strategy to ride out the dips in an upward trending stock.

=== Manage risk ===
Plan your position size around the max loss of the trade and try to cut losses short when you have determined that the trade no longer falls within the scope of your forecast.

== What to avoid ==
=== Limited upside in the early stages ===
This trade has limited upside when both legs are in play. However, once the short option expires, the remaining long position has unlimited profit potential. In the early stages of this trade, it is a neutral trading strategy. If the stock starts to move more than anticipated, this is what can result in limited gains.

=== Be aware of expiration dates ===
As the expiration date for the short option approaches, action needs to be taken. If the short option expires out of the money, then the contract expires worthless. If the option is in the money, then the trader should consider buying back the option at the market price. After the trader has taken action with the short option, he or she can then decide whether to roll the long option position.

=== Time your entry well ===
The last risk to avoid when trading calendar spreads is an untimely entry. In general, market timing is much less critical when trading spreads, but a trade that is very ill-timed can result in a max loss very quickly. Therefore, it is important to survey the condition of the overall market and to make sure you are trading within the direction of the underlying trend of the stock.

== Conclusion ==
In summary, it is important to remember that a long calendar spread is a neutral – and in some instances a directional – trading strategy that is used when a trader expects a gradual or sideways movement in the short term and has more direction bias over the life of the longer-dated option. This trade is constructed by selling a short-dated option and buying a longer-dated option, resulting in a net debit. This spread can be created with either calls or puts, and therefore can be a bullish or bearish strategy. The trader wants to see the short-dated option decay at a faster rate than the longer-dated option.

When trading this strategy here are a few key points:

- Can be traded as either a bullish or bearish strategy
- Generates profit as time decays
- Risk is limited to the net debit
- Benefits from an increase in volatility
- If assigned, the trader loses the time value left in the position
- Provides additional leverage in order to make excess returns
- Losses are limited if the stock price moves dramatically
