= Bear spread =

Stock options trading strategy

In options trading, a bear spread is a bearish, vertical spread options strategy that can be used when the options trader is moderately bearish on the underlying security.

Because of put–call parity, a bear spread can be constructed using either put options or call options. If constructed using calls, it is a bear call spread (alternatively call credit spread). If constructed using puts, it is a bear put spread (alternatively put debit spread).

== Bear call spread ==
A bear call spread is a limited profit, limited risk options trading strategy that can be used when the options trader is moderately bearish on the underlying security. It is entered by buying call options of a certain strike price and selling the same number of call options of lower strike price (in the money) on the same underlying security with the same expiration month.

=== Example ===
Consider a stock that costs $100 per share, with a call option with a strike price of $105 for $2 and a call option with a strike price of $95 for $7. To implement a bear call spread, one

- buys the $105 call option, paying a premium of $2, and
- sells the $95 call option, making a premium of $7.

The total profit after this initial options trading phase will be $5.

After the options reach expiration, the options may be exercised. If the stock price ends at a price (P) below or equal to $95, neither option will be exercised and your total profit will be the $5 per share from the initial options trade.

If the stock price ends at a price (P) above or equal to $105, both options will be exercised and your total profit per is equal to the sum of $5 from the original options trading, a loss of (P - $95) from the sold option, and a gain of (P - $105) from the bought option. Total profits will be ($5 - (P - $95) + (P - $105)) = -$5 per share (i.e. a loss of $5 per share). The loss is due to speculation that the price would go down but it actually did not.

== Bear put spread ==
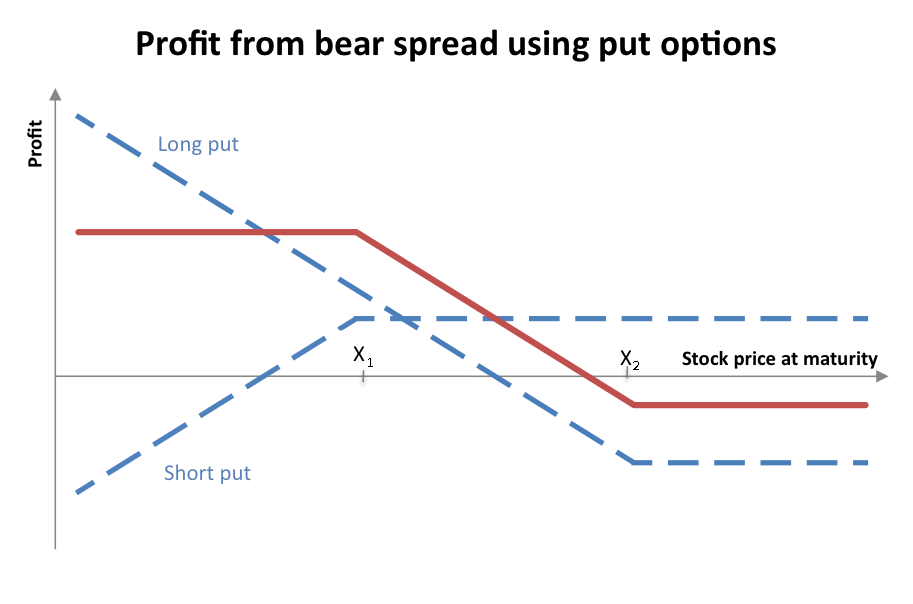
Profit diagram of a bear spread using put options

A bear put spread is a limited profit, limited risk options trading strategy that can be used when the options trader is moderately bearish on the underlying security. It is entered by:

- buying higher striking in-the-money put options and
- selling the same number of lower striking out-of-the-money put options on the same underlying security and the same expiration month.

The options trader hopes that the price of the underlying drops, maximizing his profit when the underlying drops below the strike price of the written option, netting him the difference between the strike prices minus the cost of entering into the position.

== See also ==
- Bull spread
- Box spread
- Ladder (option combination)
- Options spread
- Option
