= Vertical spread =

Financial trading strategy

In options trading, a vertical spread is an options strategy involving buying and selling of multiple options of the same underlying security, same expiration date, but at different strike prices. They can be created with either all calls or all puts. The term originates from the trading sheets that were used in the open outcry pits on which option prices were listed out by expiry date & strike price, thus looking down the sheet (vertical) the trader would see all options of the same maturity. Vertical spreads can sometimes approximate binary options, and can be produced using vanilla options.

- Bull vertical spread - Bull call spread and bull put spread are bullish vertical spreads constructed using calls and puts respectively.
- Bear vertical spread - Bear call spread and bear put spread are bearish vertical spreads constructed using calls and puts respectively.
