= Bull spread =

Options trading strategy

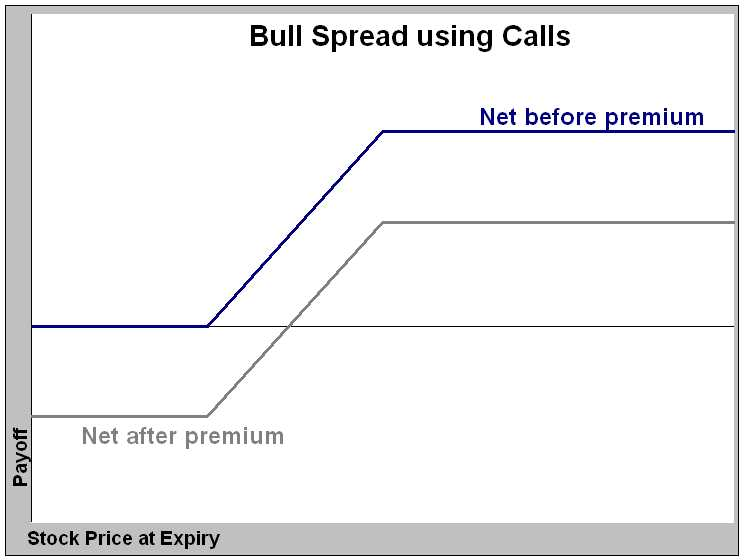
Payoffs from a bull call spread

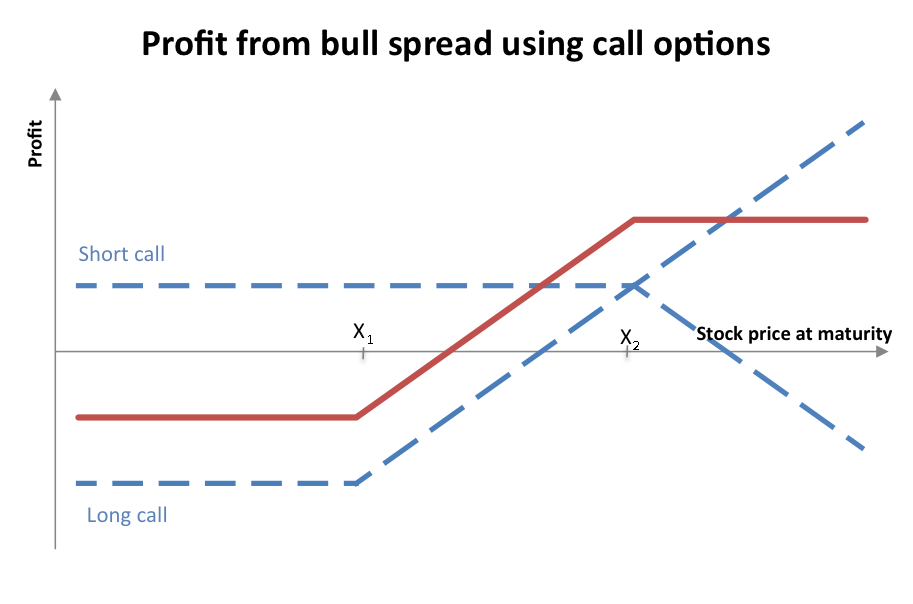
A bull spread can be constructed using two call options.

In options trading, a bull spread is a vertical spread options strategy that is designed to profit from a moderate rise in the price of the underlying security.

Because of put–call parity, a bull spread can be constructed using either put options or call options. If constructed using calls, it is a bull call spread (alternatively call debit spread). If constructed using puts, it is a bull put spread (alternatively put credit spread).

== Bull call spread ==
A bull call spread is constructed by buying a call option with a lower strike price (K), and selling another call option with a higher strike price.

Often the call with the lower exercise price will be at-the-money while the call with the higher exercise price is out-of-the-money. Both calls must have the same underlying security and expiration month. If the bull call spread is done so that both the sold and bought calls expire on the same day, it is a vertical debit call spread.

Break even point = Lower strike price+ Net premium paid

This strategy is also called a call debit spread because it causes the trader to incur a debit (spend money) up front to enter the position.

The trader will realize maximum profit on the trade if the underlying closes above the short strike on expiration.

== Bull put spread ==
A bull put spread is constructed by selling put options with a higher strike and buying the same number of put options with a lower strike on the same underlying security with the same expiration date. The options trader employing this strategy hopes that the price of the underlying security goes up far enough that the written put options expire worthless.

If the bull put spread is done so that both the sold and bought put expire on the same day, it is a vertical credit put spread.

Break even point = upper strike price - net premium received

This strategy is also called a put credit spread because the trader will receive a credit (be paid the premium) for entering the position.

The trader will realize maximum profit if the underlying closes above the short strike on expiration.

== See also ==
- Ladder (option combination)
