= Long (finance) =

Position in a financial instrument in which the holder owns a positive amount

In finance, a long position in a financial instrument means the holder of the position owns a positive amount of the instrument. The holder of the position has the expectation that the financial instrument will increase in value. This is known as a bullish position. The term "long position" is often used in context of buying options contracts.

== Ownership ==
When an investor holds a long position in a stock they are buying a share of ownership in a company. Depending on the type of Stock purchased this can entitle the shareholder to voting rights at shareholder meetings or dividend payments.

== Security ==
In terms of a security, such as a stock or a bond, or equivalently to be long in a security, means the holder of the position owns the security, on the expectation that the security will increase in value, and will profit if the price of the security goes up. Going long a security is the more conventional practice of investing.

== Future ==
Going long in a future means the holder of the position is obliged to buy the underlying instrument at the contract price at expiry. The holder of the position will profit if the price of the underlying instrument goes up, as the price he will pay will be less than the market price.

== Option ==
An options investor goes long in an underlying investment (in technical jargon, the preposition "in" is omitted) by buying call options or selling put options on it. This is different from going long by buying the underlying or trading in futures, because a long position in an option does not necessarily mean that the holder will profit if the price of the underlying instrument goes up. Going long in an option gives the right (but not obligation) for the holder to exercise it. If the price rises to above the strike price, the owner of a call option will probably exercise the option to buy the instrument and (at least on paper) will gain if the difference between the price at that time and the strike price is greater than the premium which he paid. With a put option on the other hand, the seller of the option will profit (on paper) if the price of the instrument goes up (so that the option is not exercised by the buyer), or falls by less than what he received as a premium.

== Strategy ==
- The buy-and-hold investment strategy: a long term passive strategy that makes use of a long position by a shareholder purchasing a stock and holding it for a long period of time, regardless of fluctuations in the market.

== See also ==
- Short (finance)
- Position (finance)
