= Area yield options contract =

An area yield options contract is a contract entitling the holder to receive a payment when the area yield is below the put or above the call option strike yield. The strike yield is the yield at which the holder of an option contract can exercise the option.

== Use in agricultural risk management ==
Area yield options contracts have been discussed as a way to manage regional yield risk in agriculture. A 1995 USDA Economic Research Service report explained that, under an area yield options approach, farmers would insure a crop by buying a yield put option for the expected yield in the region where they produce, with payments triggered by area yield outcomes rather than the yield of an individual farm.

This structure makes the contract a form of area-based risk management instrument, linking indemnity payments to regional production experience instead of individual farm losses. Congressional Research Service glossary material likewise defines an area yield options contract as one entitling the holder to receive a payment when the area yield is below or above the strike yield.

== See also ==
- Binary option
- Bond option
- CBOE S&P 500 PutWrite Index
- Covered call
- Credit default option
- Exotic interest rate option
- Foreign exchange option
- Interest rate cap and floor
- Married put
- Moneyness
- Naked call
- Naked put
- Option time value
- Options on futures
- Pre-emption right
- Put–call parity
- Real option
- Right of first refusal
- Stock option
- Swaption
