= Options arbitrage =

Options arbitrage is a trading strategy using arbitrage in the options market to earn small profits with very little or zero risk.

Traders perform conversions when options are relatively overpriced by purchasing stock and selling the equivalent options position. When the options are relatively underpriced, traders will do reverse conversions or reversals. In practice, actionable option arbitrage opportunities have decreased with the advent of automated trading strategies.

== Conversion ==
A conversion position is:

- short a call,
- long a put, and
- long the underlying

The call and put have the same strike value and expiration date. The resulting portfolio is delta neutral.

One reason a trader may take this position would be to extend the holding period of the underlying position for capital gains tax purposes, while locking in the current price.

== Reversal ==
A reversal (or reverse conversion) position is:

- long a call,
- short a put, and
- short the underlying.

The call and put have the same strike value and expiration date. The resulting portfolio is delta neutral.

== See also ==
- Binary option
- Options strategies
- Synthetic options position
- Volatility arbitrage
