= Volatility arbitrage =

Type of financial arbitrage

In finance, volatility arbitrage (vol arb) is a term for financial arbitrage techniques directly dependent and based on volatility.

A common type of vol arb is type of statistical arbitrage that is implemented by trading a delta neutral portfolio of an option and its underlying. The objective is to take advantage of differences between the implied volatility of the option, and a forecast of future realized volatility of the option's underlying. In volatility arbitrage, volatility rather than price is used as the unit of relative measure, i.e. traders attempt to buy volatility when it is low and sell volatility when it is high.

== Overview ==
To an option trader engaging in volatility arbitrage, an option contract is a way to speculate in the volatility of the underlying rather than a directional bet on the underlying's price. If a trader buys options as part of a delta-neutral portfolio, he is said to be long volatility. If he sells options, he is said to be short volatility. So long as the trading is done delta-neutral, buying an option is a bet that the underlying's future realized volatility will be high, while selling an option is a bet that future realized volatility will be low. Because of the put–call parity, it doesn't matter if the options traded are calls or puts. This is true because put-call parity posits a risk neutral equivalence relationship between a call, a put and some amount of the underlying. Therefore, being long a delta-hedged call results in the same returns as being long a delta-hedged put.

Volatility arbitrage is not "true economic arbitrage" (in the sense of a risk-free profit opportunity). It relies on predicting the future direction of implied volatility. Even portfolio based volatility arbitrage approaches which seek to "diversify" volatility risk can experience "black swan" events when changes in implied volatility are correlated across multiple securities and even markets. Long Term Capital Management used a volatility arbitrage approach.

== Forecast volatility ==
To engage in volatility arbitrage, a trader must first forecast the underlying's future realized volatility. This is typically done by computing the historical daily returns for the underlying for a given past sample such as 252 days (the typical number of trading days in a year for the US stock market). The trader may also use other factors, such as whether the period was unusually volatile, or if there are going to be unusual events in the near future, to adjust his forecast. For instance, if the current 252-day volatility for the returns on a stock is computed to be 15%, but it is known that an important patent dispute will likely be settled in the next year and will affect the stock, the trader may decide that the appropriate forecast volatility for the stock is 18%.

In practice, many traders and researchers use realized variance computed from high-frequency intraday returns rather than daily close-to-close data, as this provides a more precise estimate of actual volatility. A variety of econometric, machine learning, and deep learning models have been developed to produce such forecasts, as surveyed by Leushuis and Petkov (2026).

== Market (implied) volatility ==
As described in option valuation techniques, there are a number of factors that are used to determine the theoretical value of an option. However, in practice, the only two inputs to the model that change during the day are the price of the underlying and the volatility. Therefore, the theoretical price of an option can be expressed as:

$$C = f(S, \sigma, \cdot) \,$$

where $S \,$ is the price of the underlying, and $\sigma \,$ is the estimate of future volatility. Because the theoretical price function $f() \,$ is a monotonically increasing function of $\sigma \,$, there must be a corresponding monotonically increasing function $g() \,$ that expresses the volatility implied by the option's market price $\bar{C} \,$, or

$$\sigma_\bar{C} = g(S, \bar{C}, \cdot) \,$$

Or, in other words, when all other inputs including the stock price $S \,$ are held constant, there exists no more than one implied volatility $\sigma_\bar{C} \,$ for each market price $\bar{C} \,$ for the option.

Because implied volatility of an option can remain constant even as the underlying's value changes, traders use it as a measure of relative value rather than the option's market price. For instance, if a trader can buy an option whose implied volatility $\sigma_\bar{C} \,$ is 10%, it is common to say that the trader can "buy the option for 10%". Conversely, if the trader can sell an option whose implied volatility is 20%, it is said the trader can "sell the option at 20%".

For example, assume a call option is trading at $1.90 with the underlying's price at $45.50 and is yielding an implied volatility of 17.5%. A short time later, the same option might trade at $2.50 with the underlying's price at $46.36 and be yielding an implied volatility of 16.5%. Even though the option's price is higher at the second measurement, the option is still considered cheaper because the implied volatility is lower. This is because the trader can sell stock needed to hedge the long call at a higher price.

== Mechanism ==
Armed with a forecast of volatility, and capable of measuring an option's market price in terms of implied volatility, the trader is ready to begin a volatility arbitrage trade. A trader looks for options where the implied volatility, $\sigma_\bar{C} \,$ is either significantly lower than or higher than the forecast realized volatility $\sigma \,$, for the underlying. In the first case, the trader buys the option and hedges with the underlying to make a delta neutral portfolio. In the second case, the trader sells the option and then hedges the position.

Over the holding period, the trader will realize a profit on the trade if the underlying's realized volatility is closer to his forecast than it is to the market's forecast (i.e. the implied volatility). The profit is extracted from the trade through the continuous re-hedging required to keep the portfolio delta-neutral.

== See also ==
- Delta neutral
- Hedge (finance)
- Implied volatility
- Option (finance)
- Statistical arbitrage
- Volatility (finance)
- Volatility risk
- Volatility smile
