= LEAPS (finance) =

Long-term stock options

In finance, Long-term Equity AnticiPation Securities (LEAPS) are derivatives that track the price of an underlying financial instrument (stocks or indices). They are option contracts with a much longer time to expiry than standard options. According to the Options Industry Council, the educational arm of the Options Clearing Corporation, LEAPS are available on stocks and indexes that have an average daily trading volume of at least 1000 contracts. As with standard options, LEAPS are available in two forms, calls and puts.

Options were originally created with expiry cycles of 3, 6, and 9 months, with no option term lasting more than a year. Options of this form, for such terms, still constitute the vast majority of options activity. LEAPS were created relatively recently and typically extend for terms of 2 years out. Equity LEAPS typically expire in January. For example, if today were December 2020, one could buy a Microsoft option that would expire in January 2021, 2022, or 2023. The latter two are LEAPS. In practice, LEAPS behave and are traded just like standard options.

When LEAPS were first introduced in 1990, they were derivative instruments solely for stocks; however, more recently, equivalent instruments for indices have become available. These are also referred to as LEAPS.

== Applications ==
LEAPS are often used as a risk reduction tool by investors. For example, in an article in Stocks, Futures and Options Magazine, Dan Haugh of PTI Securities & Futures suggests that stock investors can manage risk and price protection by considering the purchase of an exchange-traded fund (ETF) and "...buying put protection on that ETF with LEAPS." In this example, risk is reduced when an investor in stock or ETFs buys enough LEAPS put options to protect all of the shares they own. LEAPS act like an insurance policy; it is possible to reduce the risk of loss to nothing but the purchase price of the LEAPS itself.

An investor can also buy a LEAPS call, giving them a long time (potentially more than one or two years) to profit if the underlying stock or ETF rises in price.

LEAPS are identical to standard options in how the investor gains or loses when trading them.

== See also ==
- Option (finance)
- Contract for difference
- Equity swap
