= BXM =

BXM may refer to:

- the IATA code for Batom Airport, Indonesia
- the ticker symbol for CBOE S&P 500 BuyWrite Index
