= Binary betting =

Binary betting is a type of financial betting which displays the price of a bet as an odds index from 0 to 100 where the bet settles at 100 if an event happens and 0 if it does not. The greater the likelihood of an event happening the higher this price will be. A price of 91-93, for example, suggests the betting broker which offers the bet believes the event has a 92% likelihood of happening. In derivatives theory an instrument with this all-or-nothing payoff is known as a binary or digital option, and under risk-neutral pricing its value corresponds to the discounted probability of the event, though sensitivity to the volatility skew means the quoted price is only an approximation of that probability. An event can be bought or sold, making it possible to profit both from the event occurring or not occurring. A bettor who thinks that the event will occur will buy the bet and a bettor who thinks the event won't occur will sell the bet. An event could be, for example, the "FTSE to close 11 points higher by midday", "the FTSE will end higher on the day", "Brent Oil will close between 50 and 60 cents lower" and so on.

== Types ==
- Up/down – This is the most basic form of binary betting, and the one most bettors will take. A bettor who wishes to buy this bet has to decide if the asset or market will close above or below the current spot price by the end of the trading day.
- Rise/fall
- Higher/lower – Here a trader is betting on the high or low of today being a given distance from yesterday's closing level.
- Touch/no-touch
- In/out

== Calculating winnings and losses ==
Binary bet winnings and losses are calculated in the following manner:

- When buying, profit/loss = the closing price minus the opening price times the bet size (per point)
- When selling, profit/loss = the opening price minus the closing price times the bet size (per point)

Example one: The bet is that "the FTSE will close higher on the day". The price is 38-43. Buy is chosen (agree with the proposition) at 43 for £5 per point. The FTSE does close higher on the day, meaning that the bet makes up at 100. Therefore the winnings are:

     (100 - 43) x £5 = £285

Example two: The same bet, that "the FTSE will close higher on the day". The price is 38-43. Buy is chosen (agree with the proposition) at 43 for £5 per point. The FTSE does not close higher on the day, meaning that the bet makes up at 0. Therefore the winnings - or losses in this case - are:

    (0 - 43) x £5 = -£215

Example three: The same bet, that "the FTSE will close higher on the day". The price is 38-43. Sell is chosen (disagree with the proposition) at 38 for £5 per point. The FTSE does not close higher on the day, meaning that the bet makes up at 0. Therefore the winnings are:

    (38 - 0) x £5 = £190

== Floating and fixed binaries ==
In a floating binary, the most common type, the quoted price moves while the strike price that determines settlement remains fixed. In a fixed binary, the quoted price is held constant while the strike price moves. Only a floating binary can be closed out before expiry, allowing a bettor to take an early profit or limit a loss by selling back all or part of the position.

== Taxation and legal status ==
In the United Kingdom the profit from a financial bet is generally treated as the proceeds of gambling rather than of a trade, so it falls outside capital gains tax, while the operator instead accounts for General Betting Duty on the bets it books.
