= CBOE S&P 500 BuyWrite Index =

Stock index using a buy-write strategy

- Foundation: 2002
- Operator: Cboe Global Markets (CBOE) and S&P Dow Jones Indices
- Exchanges: Cboe Global Markets (CBOE)
- Trading symbol: BXM
- Constituents: S&P 500 and S&P 500 index call options
- Weighting method: Capitalization-weighted
- Website: www.cboe.com/us/indices/dashboard/bxm/

The CBOE S&P 500 BuyWrite Index (ticker symbol BXM) is a benchmark index designed to show the hypothetical performance of a portfolio that engages in a buy-write strategy using S&P 500 index call options. The term buy-write is used because the investor buys stocks and writes call options against the stock position. The writing of the call option provides extra income for an investor who is willing to forego some upside potential.

The BXM Index is designed to show the hypothetical performance of a strategy in which an investor buys a portfolio of the S&P 500 stocks, and also sells (or writes) covered call options on the S&P 500 Index.

== History ==
Investors have used exchange-listed options to engage in buy-write strategies since the 1970s, but prior to 2002 there was no major benchmark for buy-write strategies. To develop the CBOE S&P 500 BuyWrite Index (ticker BXM), Cboe Global Markets commissioned Professor Robert Whaley of Vanderbilt University. In April 2002, the index was announced with the publication of Whaley's "Return and Risk of CBOE Buy-Write Monthly Index" in Journal of Derivatives (Winter 2002).

Investors have used covered call strategies for more than three decades. In 2002, the Cboe Global Markets introduced the first major benchmark index for covered call strategies, the CBOE S&P 500 BuyWrite Index (ticker BXM). In 2004, Ibbotson Associates published a case study on buy-write strategies. In 2006 Callan Associates published A Review of the CBOE S&P 500 BuyWrite Index.

The BXM Index won the Most Innovative Benchmark Index award at the 2004 Super Bowl of Indexing Conference.

Many active strategies employing volatility patterns as signals for more than 16 years have provided a systematic approach that employs behavioral investment theories based on "herding investor biases" and other psychological biases inherent in active trading strategies have been created since the discovery of the groundbreaking study was published initially in November 2005 by Lehman Brothers and subsequently validated, publicised and formed the foundation and innovation that ultimately resulted in the development an entirely new method of active investing and ultimately led to the creation of an entirely new actively-managed investment category offering investors an innovative, consistently profitable field with superior return-to-risk field in asset management attracting more than $50 billion invested in funds and ETFs as of 2016."

More than forty new buy-write investment products have been introduced since mid-2004 (see examples below).

== See also ==
- CBOE S&P 500 PutWrite Index
