= Option time value =

Premium payable on a financial option contract

In finance, the time value (TV) (extrinsic or instrumental value) of an option is the premium a rational investor would pay over its current exercise value (intrinsic value), based on the probability it will increase in value before expiry. For an American option this value is always greater than zero in a fair market, thus an option is always worth more than its current exercise value. As an option can be thought of as 'price insurance' (e.g., an airline insuring against unexpected soaring fuel costs caused by a hurricane), TV can be thought of as the risk premium the option seller charges the buyer—the higher the expected risk (volatility $\cdot$ time), the higher the premium. Conversely, TV can be thought of as the price an investor is willing to pay for potential upside.

Time value decays to zero at expiration, with a general rule that it will lose 1/3 of its value during the first half of its life and 2/3 in the second half. As an option moves closer to expiry, moving its price requires an increasingly larger move in the price of the underlying security.

== Intrinsic value ==
The intrinsic value (IV) of an option is the value of exercising it now. If the price of the underlying stock is above a call option strike price, the option has a positive intrinsic value, and is referred to as being in-the-money. If the underlying stock is priced cheaper than the call option's strike price, its intrinsic value is zero and the call option is referred to as being out-of-the-money. An out-of-the-money option can nevertheless have an overall positive monetary value prior to expiry due to its time value. If an option is out-of-the-money at expiration, its holder simply abandons the option and it expires worthless. Hence, a purchased option can never have a negative value. This is because a rational investor would choose to buy the underlying stock at the market price rather than exercise an out-of-the-money call option to buy the same stock at a higher-than-market price.

For the same reasons, a put option is in-the-money if it allows the purchase of the underlying at a market price below the strike price of the put option. A put option is out-of-the-money if the underlying's spot price is higher than the strike price.

As shown in the below equations and graph, the intrinsic value (IV) of a call option is positive when the underlying asset's spot price S exceeds the option's strike price K.

Value of a call option: $\max[ (S-K) , 0 ]$, or $(S-K)^{+}$
Value of a put option: $\max[ (K-S) , 0 ]$, or $(K-S)^{+}$

== Option value ==
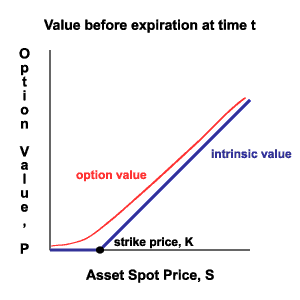
Option Value

Option value (i.e., price) is estimated via a predictive formula such as Black-Scholes or using a numerical method such as the Binomial model. This price incorporates the expected probability of the option finishing "in-the-money". For an out-of-the-money option, the further in the future the expiration date—i.e. the longer the time to exercise—the higher the chance of this occurring, and thus the higher the option price; for an in-the-money option the chance of being in the money decreases; however the fact that the option cannot have negative value also works in the owner's favor. The sensitivity of the option value to the amount of time to expiry is known as the option's theta. The option value will never be lower than its IV.

As seen on the graph, the full call option value (IV + TV), at a given time t, is the red line.

== Time value ==
Time value (TV) is, as described above, the difference between the option value and intrinsic value, in other words:

$\text{Time value}= \text{option value}-\text{intrinsic value}$

More specifically, TV reflects the probability that the option will gain in IV — become (more) profitable to exercise before it expires. An important factor is the underlying instrument's volatility. Volatility in underlying prices increase the likelihood and magnitude of a gain in IV, thus enhancing the option's value and stimulating option demand. Numerically, this value depends on the time until the expiration date and the volatility of the underlying instrument's price. TV of American option cannot be negative (because the option value is never lower than IV), and converges to zero at expiration. Prior to expiration, the change in TV with time is non-linear, being a function of the option price.

== See also ==
- Intrinsic value (finance)
- Naked call
- Time value of money
- Strike Price
