= Credit default option =

Finance term

In finance, a default option, credit default swaption or credit default option is an option to buy protection (payer option) or sell protection (receiver option) as a credit default swap on a specific reference credit with a specific maturity. The option is usually European, exercisable only at one date in the future at a specific strike price defined as a coupon on the credit default swap.

Credit default options on single credits are extinguished upon default without any cashflows, other than the upfront premium paid by the buyer of the option. Therefore, buying a payer option is not a good protection against an actual default, only against a rise in the credit spread. This may explain why such options are very illiquid. They may also feature quite high implied volatilities, as shown by Damiano Brigo (2005). However options on credit indices such as iTraxx and CDX include any defaulted entities in the intrinsic value of the option when exercised. This is expressed at times by stating that the options offer "front-end protection". Proper inclusion of front end protection complicates index options valuation, see for example Claus M. Pedersen (2003), or Brigo and Morini (2008).

== See also ==
- Option (finance)
- Credit default swap
- Credit derivative
