= Protective option =

Stock options trading strategy

Payoffs from a long call position, equivalent to that of a protective put

Payoffs from a long put position, equivalent to that of a protective call

A protective option or married option is a financial transaction in which the holder of securities buys a type of financial options contract known as a "call" or a "put" against stock that they own or are shorting. The buyer of a protective option pays compensation, or "premium", for this transaction, which can limit losses on their stock position. One protective option is purchased for every hundred shares the buyer wishes to cover. A protective option constructed with a put to cover shares of stock that an investor owns is called a protective put or married put, while one constructed with a call to cover shorted stock is a protective call or married call. In equilibrium, a protective put will have the same net payoff as merely buying a call option, and a protective call will have the same net payoff as merely buying a put option.

A protective option could be used instead of a stop-loss order to limit losses on a stock position, especially in a fast-moving market. Although buyers of a protective option have to pay the up-front cost of the premium, the advantage is that they cannot lose more money than the option's strike price, while a stop order could fill at a price worse than the stop price. Secondly, a stop loss could trigger during a stock's temporary retracement or pullback just before it reverses back to the original direction again, while an option could last through all of that volatility until its expiration date.

== See also ==
- Covered option
