= Batom Airport =

- IATA: BXM; ICAO: none

Summary
- Location: Batom, Pegunungan Bintang Regency, Highland Papua
- Coordinates: 4.443055°S 140.882697°E

Map
- Location in Western New Guinea Location in Indonesia

Runways
Direction	Length		Surface
Direction	ft	m	Surface
02/20	6.573	2.004	Asphalt

Batom Airport (IATA: BXM) is an airport in Batom, Highland Papua, Indonesia.
