= Covered option =

Stock options trading strategy

Payoffs from a short put position, equivalent to that of a covered call

Payoffs from a short call position, equivalent to that of a covered put

A covered option is a financial transaction in which the holder of securities sells (or "writes") an options contract, either a "call option" or a "put option", against stock that they own or are short, respectively.

The seller of a covered option receives compensation, or "premium", for this transaction, which can limit losses; however, the act of selling a covered option also limits profit potential and so the strategy reduces both risk and potential return. One covered option contract is sold for every hundred shares the seller wishes to cover.

A covered option constructed with a call is called a "covered call", while one constructed with a put is a "covered put". Both variants are a short implied volatility strategy.

== Covered calls ==
In a covered call, a trader buys or owns a stock and sells a call option on such stock. Covered calls are bullish by nature. The payoff from selling a covered call is identical to selling a short naked put.

Covered calls can be sold at various levels of moneyness. Out-of-the-money covered calls have a higher potential for profit, but also protect against less risk, as compared to in-the-money covered calls.

== Covered puts ==
Covered put options protect an option writer if the market price of the underlying asset drops far below the option strike price. In a covered put option, the option writer shorts the underlying asset and sells a put option to reacquire such asset.

== See also ==
- Protective option

== Bibliography ==
- Brill, Maria. "Options for Generating Income." Financial Advisor. (July 2006) pp. 85–86.
- Calio, Vince. Covered Calls Become Another Alpha Source." Pensions & Investments. (May 1, 2006).
- "Covered Call Strategy Could Have Helped, Study Shows" Pensions & Investments, Sept. 20, 2004, p. 38.
- Crawford, Gregory. "Buy Writing Makes Comeback as Way to Hedge Risk." Pensions & Investments. May 16, 2005.
- Demby, Elayne Robertson. "Maintaining Speed -- In a Sideways or Falling Market, Writing Covered Call Options Is One Way To Give Your Clients Some Traction." Bloomberg Wealth Manager, February 2005.
- Feldman, Barry, and Dhruv Roy, "Passive Options-Based Investment Strategies: The Case of the CBOE S&P 500 BuyWrite Index." The Journal of Investing . (Summer 2005).
- Frankel, Doris. "Buy-writes Catch on in Sideways U.S. Stock Market." Reuters. (Jun 17, 2005).
- Fulton, Benjamin T., and Matthew T. Moran. "BuyWrite Benchmark Indexes and the First Options-Based ETFs" Institutional Investor—A Guide to ETFs and Indexing Innovations (Fall 2008), pp. 101–110.
- Szado, Edward, and Thomas Schneeweis. "Loosening Your Collar: Alternative Implementations of QQQ Collars." CISDM, Isenberg School of Management, University of Massachusetts, Amherst. (Original Version: August 2009. Current Update: September 2009).
- Kapadia, Nikunj, and Edward Szado. "The Risk and Return Characteristics of the Buy-Write Strategy on the Russell 2000 Index." The Journal of Alternative Investments. (Spring 2007). pp. 39–56.
- Renicker, Ryan, Devapriya Mallick. "Enhanced Call Overwriting." Lehman Brothers Equity Derivatives Strategy. (Nov 17, 2005).
- Tan, Kopin. "Better Covered Calls. Covered-Call Writing Yields Higher Returns in Down Markets." Barron's: The Striking Price. (Nov 28, 2005).
- Tan, Kopin. "More Bang, Less Buck. Selling Call Options." Barron's, SmartMoney. (Dec. 2, 2005).
- Hill, Joanne, Venkatesh Balasubramanian, Krag (Buzz) Gregory, and Ingrid Tierens. "Finding Alpha via Covered Index Writing." Financial Analysts Journal. (Sept.-Oct. 2006). pp. 29–46.
- Lauricella, Tom. "'Buy Write' Funds May Well Be The Right Strategy." Wall Street Journal. (Sep 8, 2008). pg. R1.
- Moran, Matthew. "Risk-adjusted Performance for Derivatives-based Indexes - Tools to Help Stabilize Returns." The Journal of Indexes. (Fourth Quarter, 2002) pp. 34 – 40.
- Schneeweis, Thomas, and Richard Spurgin. "The Benefits of Index Option-Based Strategies for Institutional Portfolios" The Journal of Alternative Investments, Spring 2001, pp. 44 – 52.
- Tan, Kopin. "Covered Calls Grow in Popularity as Stock Indexes Remain Sluggish." The Wall Street Journal, April 12, 2002.
- Tergesen, Anne. "Taking Cover with Covered Calls." Business Week, May 21, 2001, p. 132.
- Tracy, Tennille. "'Buy-Write' Is Looking Attractive." The Wall Street Journal. (Dec 1, 2008). pg. C6.
- Whaley, Robert. "Risk and Return of the CBOE BuyWrite Monthly Index." The Journal of Derivatives (Winter 2002) pp. 35 – 42.
