= CBOE S&P 500 PutWrite Index =

Benchmark index

- Foundation: 2007
- Operator: S&P Dow Jones Indices
- Exchanges: Cboe Global Markets
- Trading symbol: PUT
- Related indices: S&P 500
- Website: www.cboe.com/micro/put/

The CBOE S&P 500 PutWrite Index (ticker symbol PUT) is a benchmark index that measures the performance of a hypothetical portfolio that sells S&P 500 Index (SPX) put options against collateralized cash reserves held in a money market account.

== Description ==
The PUT strategy is designed to sell a sequence of one-month, at-the-money, S&P 500 Index puts and invest cash at one- and three-month Treasury Bill rates. The number of puts sold varies from month to month, but is limited so that the amount held in Treasury Bills can finance the maximum possible loss from final settlement of the SPX puts. The PUT Index was introduced in 2007 by Cboe Global Markets. The Index is calculated and disseminated daily by CBOE and the daily price history of the PUT Index dates back to June 30, 1986.

== Award for Innovation ==
The CBOE S&P 500 PutWrite Index (PUT) won the annual award for the Most Innovative Benchmark Index at the Twelfth Annual Super Bowl of Indexing Conference in Scottsdale, Arizona on December 3, 2007. The 2007 award for the PUT Index was one of only three product awards granted as part of the William F. Sharpe Indexing Achievement Awards.

== Study by Ennis Knupp + Associates ==
On January 5, 2009, the consulting firm of Ennis Knupp + Associates issued a press release that introduced a new six-page study on the performance of five benchmark indexes for the period from July 1986 through October 2008 - the PUT Index, the S&P 500 Index, the MSCI EAFE Index, the Barclays Capital Aggregate Bond Index and 3-Month Treasury Bills. Among the key findings of the study were the following:

1. Annualized Returns. The PUT Index had annualized returns of 10.32% during the period analyzed, higher than the other four indexes studied. (The annualized returns were 8.77% for the S&P 500, 7.16% for the Barclays Capital Aggregate Bond Index, 6.11% for MSCI EAFE Index, and 4.09% for 3-Month Treasury Bills.)

2. Volatility. The PUT Index had an annualized standard deviation of returns of 9.91%, which was 36% less than the 15.39% standard deviation for the S&P 500. (Other annualized standard deviations were 17.39% for MSCI EAFE Index, 4.05% for the Barclays Capital Aggregate Bond Index, and 0.53% for 3-Month Treasury Bills.)

3. Relative Performance. The PUT Index has tended to outperform the S&P 500 in quiet and falling markets, and underperform the S&P 500 in months when stock prices rise sharply. In the months in which the S&P 500 experienced large positive returns, the average monthly returns were 4.14% for the S&P 500 and 2.11% for the PUT Index. In the months in which the S&P 500 experienced large negative returns, the average monthly returns were negative 5.38% for the S&P 500 and negative 2.93% for the PUT Index.

4. High Gross Monthly Premiums and Sources of Return. On average, selling the at-the-money put option each month earned a premium of 1.65% of the notional value of the index, which averaged 19.8% per year. The income return of 19.8% exceeds the total return of 10.3%, as a portion of premiums are paid to insure losses of the put buyers. The PUT Index had a higher Sharpe ratio, higher Sortino Ratio, and more negative skewness than the S&P 500 Index. A key source of excess returns for the PUT Index lies in the fact that index options have tended to trade at prices above their fair value, and so some sellers of short-term index options have been able to generate excess risk-adjusted returns. Annual income from the sale of put options is higher from the sale of 1-month options than the sale of longer maturity options.

5. Investing in the Index. The first licensed fund designed to track the PUT Index was launched in April 2007, and the fund and the PUT Index had a very similar risk-return tradeoff, experiencing a correlation of 0.99 since inception.
