= Put–call parity =

Concept in financial mathematics

In financial mathematics, the put–call parity defines a relationship between the price of a European call option and European put option, both with the identical strike price and expiry, namely that a portfolio of a long call option and a short put option is equivalent to (and hence has the same value as) a single forward contract at this strike price and expiry. This is because if the price at expiry is above the strike price, the call will be exercised, while if it is below, the put will be exercised, and thus in either case one unit of the asset will be purchased for the strike price, exactly as in a forward contract.

The validity of this relationship requires that certain assumptions be satisfied; these are specified and the relationship is derived below. In practice transaction costs and financing costs (leverage) mean this relationship will not exactly hold, but in liquid markets the relationship is close to exact.

== Assumptions ==
Put–call parity is a static replication, and thus requires minimal assumptions, of a forward contract. In the absence of traded forward contracts, the forward contract can be replaced (indeed, itself replicated) by the ability to buy the underlying asset and finance this by borrowing for fixed term (e.g., borrowing bonds), or conversely to borrow and sell (short) the underlying asset and loan the received money for term, in both cases yielding a self-financing portfolio.

These assumptions do not require any transactions between the initial date and expiry, and are thus significantly weaker than those of the Black–Scholes model, which requires dynamic replication and continual transaction in the underlying.

Replication assumes one can enter into derivative transactions, which requires leverage (and capital costs to back this), and buying and selling entails transaction costs, notably the bid–ask spread. The relationship thus only holds exactly in an ideal frictionless market with unlimited liquidity. However, real world markets may be sufficiently liquid that the relationship is close to exact, most significantly FX markets in major currencies or major stock indices, in the absence of market turbulence.

== Statement ==
Put–call parity can be stated in a number of equivalent ways, most tersely as:

$C - P = D\cdot(F - K)$

where $C$ is the (current) value of a call, $P$ is the (current) value of a put, $D$ is the discount factor, $F$ is the forward price of the underlying asset, and $K$ is the strike price. The left side corresponds to a portfolio of a long call and a short put; the right side corresponds to a forward contract. The assets $C$ and $P$ on the left side are given in present values, while the assets $F$ and $K$ are given in future values (forward price of asset, and strike price paid at expiry), which the discount factor $D$ converts to present values.

Now the spot price $S = D\cdot F$ can be obtained by discounting the forward price $F$ by the factor $D$. Using spot price $S$ instead of forward price $F$ gives us:

$C - P = S - D\cdot K$.

Rearranging the terms gives a first interpretation:

$C + D \cdot K = P + S$.

Here the left-hand side is a fiduciary call, which is a long call and enough cash (or bonds) to exercise it by paying the strike price. The right-hand side is a Married put, which is a long put paired with the asset, so that the asset can be sold at the strike price on exercise. At expiry, the intrinsic value of options vanish so both sides have payoff $\max(K, S)$ equal to at least the strike price $K$ or the value $S$ of the asset if higher.

That a long call with cash is equivalent to a long put with asset is one meaning of put-call parity.

Rearranging the terms another way gives us a second interpretation:

$D \cdot K - P = S - C$.

Now the left-hand side is a cash-secured put, that is, a short put and enough cash to give the put owner should they exercise it. The right-hand side is a covered call, which is a short call paired with the asset, where the asset stands ready to be called away by the call owner should they exercise it. At expiry, the previous scenario is flipped. Both sides now have payoff $\min(K, S)$ equal to either the strike price $K$ or the value $S$ of the asset, whichever is lower.

So we see that put-call parity can also be understood as the equivalence of a cash-secured (short) put and a covered (short) call. This may be surprising as selling a cash-secured put is typically seen as riskier than selling a covered call.

To make explicit the time-value of cash and the time-dependence of financial variables, the original put-call parity equation can be stated as:

$C(t) - P(t) = S(t)- K \cdot B(t,T)$

where

$C(t)$ is the value of the call at time $t$,
$P(t)$ is the value of the put of the same expiration date,
$S(t)$ is the spot price of the underlying asset,
$K$ is the strike price, and
$B(t,T)$ is the present value of a zero-coupon bond that matures to $1 at time $T$, that is, the discount factor for $K.$

Note that the right-hand side of the equation is also the price of buying a forward contract on the stock with delivery price $K$. Thus one way to read the equation is that a portfolio that is long a call and short a put is the same as being long a forward. In particular, if the underlying is not tradable but there exists forwards on it, we can replace the right-hand-side expression by the price of a forward.

If the bond interest rate, $r$, is assumed to be constant then

$B(t,T) = e^{-r(T-t)}$

Note: $r$ refers to the force of interest, which is approximately equal to the effective annual rate for small interest rates. However, one should take care with the approximation, especially with larger rates and larger time periods. To find $r$ exactly, use $r = \ln (1+i)$, where $i$ is the effective annual interest rate.

When valuing European options written on stocks with known dividends that will be paid out during the life of the option, the formula becomes:

$C(t) - P(t) + D(t) = S(t) - K \cdot B(t,T)$

where $D(t)$ represents the total value of the dividends from one stock share to be paid out over the remaining life of the options, discounted to present value.

We can rewrite the equation as:

$C(t) - P(t) = S(t) - K \cdot B(t,T)\ - D(t)$

and note that the right-hand side is the price of a forward contract on the stock with delivery price $K$, as before.

== Derivation ==
We will suppose that the put and call options are on traded stocks, but the underlying can be any other tradeable asset. The ability to buy and sell the underlying is crucial to the "no arbitrage" argument below.

First, note that under the assumption that there are no arbitrage opportunities (the prices are arbitrage-free), two portfolios that always have the same payoff at time T must have the same value at any prior time. To prove this suppose that, at some time t before T, one portfolio were cheaper than the other. Then one could purchase (go long) the cheaper portfolio and sell (go short) the more expensive one. At time T, this long/short portfolio excluding cash would, for any value of the share price, have zero value (all the assets and liabilities have canceled out). The cash profit we made at time t is thus a riskless profit, but this violates our assumption of no arbitrage.

We will derive the put-call parity relation by creating two portfolios with the same payoffs (static replication) and invoking the above principle (rational pricing).

Consider a call option and a put option with the same strike K for expiry at the same date T on some stock S, which pays no dividend. We assume the existence of a bond that pays 1 dollar at maturity time T. The bond price may be random (like the stock) but must equal 1 at maturity.

Let the price of S be S(t) at time t. Now assemble a portfolio by buying a call option C and selling a put option P of the same maturity T and strike K. The payoff for this portfolio is S(T) - K. Now assemble a second portfolio by buying one share and borrowing K bonds. Note the payoff of the latter portfolio is also S(T) - K at time T, since our share bought for S(t) will be worth S(T) and the borrowed bonds will be worth K.

By our preliminary observation that identical payoffs imply that both portfolios must have the same price at a general time $t$, the following relationship exists between the value of the various instruments:

$C(t) - P(t) = S(t)- K \cdot B(t,T) \,$

Thus given no arbitrage opportunities, the above relationship, which is known as put-call parity, holds, and for any three prices of the call, put, bond and stock one can compute the implied price of the fourth.

In the case of dividends, the modified formula can be derived in similar manner to above, but with the modification that one portfolio consists of going long a call, going short a put, and going long D(T) bonds that each pay 1 dollar at maturity T (the bonds will be worth D(t) at time t); the other portfolio is the same as before - long one share of stock, short K bonds that each pay 1 dollar at T. The difference is that at time T, the stock is not only worth S(T) but has paid out D(T) in dividends.

== History ==
Forms of put-call parity appeared in practice as early as medieval ages, and was formally described by a number of authors in the early 20th century.

Michael Knoll, in The Ancient Roots of Modern Financial Innovation: The Early History of Regulatory Arbitrage, describes the important role that put-call parity played in developing the equity of redemption, the defining characteristic of a modern mortgage, in medieval England.

In the 19th century, financier Russell Sage used put-call parity to create synthetic loans, which had higher interest rates than the usury laws of the time would have normally allowed.

Nelson, an option arbitrage trader in New York, published a book: "The A.B.C. of Options and Arbitrage" in 1904 that describes the put-call parity in detail. His book was re-discovered by Espen Gaarder Haug in the early 2000s and many references from Nelson's book are given in Haug's book "Derivatives Models on Models".

Henry Deutsch describes the put-call parity in 1910 in his book "Arbitrage in Bullion, Coins, Bills, Stocks, Shares and Options, 2nd Edition". London: Engham Wilson but in less detail than Nelson (1904).

Mathematics professor Vinzenz Bronzin also derives the put-call parity in 1908 and uses it as part of his arbitrage argument to develop a series of mathematical option models under a series of different distributions. The work of professor Bronzin was just recently rediscovered by professor Wolfgang Hafner and professor Heinz Zimmermann. The original work of Bronzin is a book written in German and is now translated and published in English in an edited work by Hafner and Zimmermann ("Vinzenz Bronzin's option pricing models", Springer Verlag).

Its first description in the modern academic literature appears to be by Hans R. Stoll in the Journal of Finance.

== Implications ==
Put–call parity implies:

- Equivalence of calls and puts: Parity implies that a call and a put can be used interchangeably in any delta-neutral portfolio. If $d$ is the call's delta, then buying a call, and selling $d$ shares of stock, is the same as selling a put at the same strike and selling $1 - d$ shares of stock. Equivalence of calls and puts is very important when trading options.
- Parity of implied volatility: In the absence of dividends or other costs of carry (such as when a stock is difficult to borrow or sell short), the implied volatility of calls and puts must be identical.

== See also ==
- Spot-future parity
- Vinzenz Bronzin
