= Options Clearing Corporation =

Financial services business

- Industry: Financial services
- Founded: 1973
- Headquarters: Chicago, Illinois, U.S.
- Products: Clearing house (finance), Equity derivatives clearing
- Website: www.theocc.com

Options Clearing Corporation (OCC) is a United States clearing house based in Chicago. It specializes in equity derivatives clearing, providing central counterparty (CCP) clearing and settlement services to 16 exchanges. It was started by Wayne Luthringshausen and carried on by Michael Cahill. Its instruments include options, financial and commodity futures, security futures, and securities lending transactions.

Like all clearing houses, the OCC acts as a guarantor between clearing parties, ensuring that the obligations of the contracts it clears are fulfilled. It currently holds approximately $100 billion of collateral deposited by clearing members and moves billions of dollars a day. In 2011, OCC became the largest equity derivatives clearing organization in the United States. Furthermore, in 2016, it cleared contract volume totaled 4.17 billion, making it the fifth highest annual total in OCC's history.

OCC currently operates under the jurisdiction of both the Securities and Exchange Commission (SEC) and the Commodity Futures Trading Commission (CFTC). Under its SEC jurisdiction, OCC clears transactions for put and call options on common stock and other equity issues, stock indexes, foreign currencies, interest rate composites, and single-stock futures. As a registered Derivatives Clearing Organization (DCO) under CFTC jurisdiction and a designated Systemically Important Financial Market Utility (SIFMU) under the Dodd-Frank Act, OCC offers clearing and settlement services for transactions in futures and options on futures contracts.

OCC is overseen by a clearing member dominated board of directors and operates as a financial market utility, receiving most of its revenue from clearing fees charged to its members.

== History ==
The Options Clearing Corporation (OCC) was founded in 1973, initially as a clearing house for five listed markets for equity options. Prior to its establishment, due to a great deal of encouragement from the SEC, the Chicago Board Options Exchange had its clearing entity, the CBOE Clearing Corporation.

Clearing volumes had increased dramatically since its launch, reflecting the growing use of equity options. In October 2000, for example, the clearing house reported a clearing monthly volume record of 75.3 million contracts. In August 2011, OCC reported a record monthly volume of 550 million contracts.

However, on August 8, 2011, Standard & Poor's lowered the ratings on clearing facilities, including the OCC, to double-A-plus, one step below the triple-A rating. OCC issued a statement in response to the downgrade that included this quote from OCC's then-chairman and CEO Wayne P. Luthringshausen: “This rating change will have no negative impact on OCC’s operations or our ability to meet our obligations to OCC’s clearing members."

Also in 2011, Standard & Poor's and OCC announced a licensing agreement whereby OCC would clear over-the-counter (OTC) options based on the S&P 500. The deal marked the first time a clearing house would clear OTC options on S&P indexes. It also included the S&P MidCap 400 and S&P SmallCap 600. In July, 2012 the Financial Stability Oversight Council (FSOC) designated OCC as a Systemically Important Financial Market Utility (SIFMU) as a part of the Dodd-Frank financial overhaul law.

In September 2013, OCC filed to become compliant with the European Market Infrastructure Regulation, which will enable banks registered in the region to trade U.S. options without incurring higher capital costs for firms there who want to trade U.S. equity derivatives. In the same month, OCC appointed Craig Donohue as executive chairman. In an interview with Crain's Magazine, Donohue considered himself a change agent in the industry and will continue to be at OCC. His role designated him to oversee a transition of Cahill's responsibilities to other OCC executives during the search; additionally, Chief Operating Officer Michael McClain, 46, took on the additional title of president as part of the transition. In January 2014, OCC officially received regulatory approvals to clear OTC equity index options. The launch of the OTC S&P 500 equity index option clearing services took place in April 2014.

On September 29, 2014, OCC and the U.S. options exchanges announced the adoption of new principles-based risk control standards. The new standards included price reasonability checks, drill-through protections, activity-based protections and kill-switch protections, with its regulatory approval impending. The reforms were designed to reduce the risk of errors or unintended activity that could cause or contribute to a financial loss to market participants and OCC. On June 30, 2016, OCC imposed an additional $.02 charge per contract side on clearing members for transactions that have been executed at exchanges that have not demonstrated compliance with the exchange risk control standards. OCC also announced a $39 million refund to clearing members and the dividend of approximately $17 million to Stockholder Exchanges to be dispersed in Q1 of 2016 along with OCC financial statements.

During February 2023, the Commodity Futures Trading Commission issued an order against OCC. The order found that OCC did not establish and implement policies and procedures designed to manage risk related to the company's automated systems. The order carried a $5 million penalty for the violations which the OCC agreed to fulfil.

== Participant exchanges and clearing members ==
OCC's participant exchanges include: BOX Options Exchange LLC, Cboe BZX Exchange, Inc., Cboe C2 Exchange, Inc., Cboe EDGX Exchange, Inc., Cboe Exchange, Inc., Miami International Securities Exchange, LLC, MIAX PEARL, LLC, Nasdaq GEMX, LLC, Nasdaq ISE, LLC, Nasdaq BX, Inc., Nasdaq MRX, LLC, Nasdaq PHLX, LLC, Nasdaq Options Market, LLC, NYSE American Options, LLC, and NYSE Arca, Inc. Its clearing members serve both professional traders and public customers and are approximately 115 of the largest U.S. broker-dealers, futures commission merchants and non-U.S. securities firms.

OCC also serves other markets, including those of trading commodity futures, commodity options, and security futures. OCC clears futures contracts traded on CBOE Futures Exchange, NYSE Liffe, NASDAQ OMX Futures Exchange and ELX Futures, in addition to security futures contracts traded on OneChicago and options on futures contracts traded at NYSE Liffe US. Furthermore, OCC provides central counterparty services for two securities lending market structures, OCC's OTC Stock Loan Program and AQS, an automated marketplace for securities lending and borrowing.

OCC is also a sponsor of the Options Industry Council, an industry resource that is funded and managed by OCC to promote exchange-listed options. OIC's Roundtable is the independent governing body of the council and is composed of representatives from the U.S. options exchanges, member brokerage firms and OCC.

== Margining ==
Key to a clearing organization is margin requirement, which manages its credit risk (risk of member default).

Since the 1980s, OCC had used margining system which were known as TIMS (Theoretical Intermarket Margin System). In 2006, however, this system was replaced by a new system called STANS (System for Theoretical Analysis and Numerical Simulations).

== See also ==
- Securities market participants (United States)
- CCP Global
