= Expiration (options) =

Last date at which an option contract can be exercised by its holder

In finance, the expiration date of an option contract (represented by Greek letter tau, τ) is the last date on which the holder of the option may exercise it according to its terms. In the case of options with "automatic exercise", the net value of the option is credited to the long and debited to the short position holders.

Typically, exchange-traded option contracts expire according to a predetermined calendar. For instance, for U.S. exchange-listed equity stock option contracts, the expiration date is always the Saturday that follows the third Friday of the month, unless that Friday is a market holiday, in which case the expiration is on Thursday right before that Friday.

The clearing firm may automatically exercise by exception any option that is in the money at expiration to preserve its value for the holder of the option and at the same time, benefit from the commission fees collected from the account holder. However, the holder or the holder's broker may request that the options are not exercised automatically. Out of the money options are not exercised automatically.

Upon expiration any margin charged held by the clearing firm of the holder or writer of the option is released back to the free balance of the trader's account.

== Exercise by exception ==
At expiration, certain listed options may be exercised automatically under an exercise by exception procedure. Under this process, options that are in the money by a specified threshold are exercised unless contrary instructions are submitted.

The procedure is an administrative mechanism for listed options at expiration and does not remove the need for customers to communicate exercise instructions to their brokers before expiration.
