= Put option =

Contract giving a seller the right to sell an asset to the buyer at a set price

In finance, a put or put option is a derivative instrument in financial markets that gives the holder (i.e. the purchaser of the put option) the right to sell an asset (the underlying), at a specified price (the strike), by (or on) a specified date (the expiry or maturity) to the writer (i.e. seller) of the put. The purchase of a put option is interpreted as a negative sentiment about the future value of the underlying stock. The term "put" comes from the fact that the owner has the right to "put up for sale" the stock or index.

Puts may also be combined with other derivatives as part of more complex investment strategies, and in particular, may be useful for hedging. Holding a European put option is equivalent to holding the corresponding call option and selling an appropriate forward contract. This equivalence is called "put-call parity".

Put options are most commonly used in the stock market to protect against a fall in the price of a stock below a specified price. If the price of the stock declines below the strike price, the holder of the put has the right, but not the obligation, to sell the asset at the strike price, while the seller of the put has the obligation to purchase the asset at the strike price if the owner uses the right to do so (the holder is said to exercise the option). In this way the buyer of the put will receive at least the strike price specified, even if the asset is currently worthless.

If the strike is K, and at time t the value of the underlying is S(t), then in an American option the buyer can exercise the put for a payout of K−S(t) any time until the option's maturity date T. The put yields a positive return only if the underlying price falls below the strike when the option is exercised. A European option can only be exercised at time T rather than at any time until T, and a Bermudan option can be exercised only on specific dates listed in the terms of the contract. If the option is not exercised by maturity, it expires worthless. (The buyer will not usually exercise the option at an allowable date if the price of the underlying is greater than K.)

The most obvious use of a put option is as a type of insurance. In the protective put strategy, the investor buys enough puts to cover their holdings of the underlying so that if the price of the underlying falls sharply, they can still sell it at the strike price. Another use is for speculation: an investor can take a short position in the underlying stock without trading in it directly.

== Instrument models ==
The terms for exercising the option's right to sell it differ depending on option style. A European-style put option can be exercised only on the expiration date. An American-style put option allows exercise at any time before or on the expiration date.

The most widely traded put options are on stocks/equities, but they are traded on many other instruments such as interest rates (see interest rate floor) or commodities.

The put buyer either believes that the underlying asset's price will fall by the exercise date or hopes to protect a long position in it. The advantage of buying a put over short selling the asset is that the option owner's risk of loss is limited to the premium paid for it, whereas the asset short seller's risk of loss is unlimited (its price can rise greatly, in fact, in theory it can rise infinitely, and such a rise is the short seller's loss). The put buyer's prospect (risk) of gain is limited to the option's strike price less the underlying's spot price and the premium/fee paid for it.

The put 'writer' believes that the underlying security's price will rise, not fall. The writer sells the put to collect the premium. The put writer's total potential loss is limited to the put's strike price less the spot and premium already received. Puts can be used also to limit the writer's portfolio risk and may be part of an options spread.

The put buyer is short on the underlying asset of the put, but long on the put option itself. That is, the buyer wants the value of the put option to increase by a decline in the price of the underlying asset below the strike price. The writer (seller) of a put is long on the underlying asset and short on the put option itself. That is, the seller wants the option to become worthless by an increase in the price of the underlying asset above the strike price. Generally, a put option that is purchased is referred to as a long put and a put option that is sold is referred to as a short put.

A naked put, also called an uncovered put, is a put option whose writer (the seller) does not have a position in the underlying stock or other instrument. This strategy is best used by investors who want to accumulate a position in the underlying stock, but only if the price is low enough. If the buyer fails to exercise the options, then the writer keeps the option premium. If the underlying stock's market price is below the option's strike price when expiration arrives, the option owner (buyer) can exercise the put option, forcing the writer to buy the underlying stock at the strike price. That allows the exerciser (buyer) to profit from the difference between the stock's market price and the option's strike price. But if the stock's market price is above the option's strike price at the end of expiration day, the option expires worthless, and the owner's loss is limited to the premium (fee) paid for it (the writer's profit).

The seller's potential loss on a naked put can be substantial. If the stock falls all the way to zero (bankruptcy), his loss is equal to the strike price (at which he must buy the stock to cover the option) minus the premium received. The potential upside is the premium received when selling the option: if the stock price is above the strike price at expiration, the option seller keeps the premium, and the option expires worthless. During the option's lifetime, if the stock moves lower, the option's premium may increase (depending on how far the stock falls and how much time passes). If it does, it becomes more costly to close the position (repurchase the put, sold earlier), resulting in a loss. If the stock price completely collapses before the put position is closed, the put writer potentially can face catastrophic loss. In order to protect the put buyer from default, the put writer is required to post margin. The put buyer does not need to post margin because the buyer would not exercise the option if it had a negative payoff.

== Example of a put option on a stock ==
Payoff from buying a put.

Payoff from writing a put.

=== Buying a put ===
A buyer thinks the price of a stock will decrease. They pay a premium that they will never get back, unless it is sold before it expires. The buyer has the right to sell the stock at the strike price.

=== Writing a put ===
The writer receives a premium from the buyer. If the buyer exercises their option, the writer will buy the stock at the strike price. If the buyer does not exercise their option, the writer's profit is the premium.

- "Trader A" (Put Buyer) purchases a put contract to sell 100 shares of XYZ Corp. to "Trader B" (Put Writer) for $50 per share. The current price is $50 per share, and Trader A pays a premium of $5 per share. If the price of XYZ stock falls to $40 a share right before expiration, then Trader A can exercise the put by buying 100 shares for $4,000 from the stock market, then selling them to Trader B for $5,000.

Trader A's total earnings S can be calculated at $500. The sale of the 100 shares of stock at a strike price of $50 to Trader B = $5,000 (P). The purchase of 100 shares of stock at $40 = $4,000 (Q). The put option premium paid to Trader B for buying the contract of 100 shares at $5 per share, excluding commissions = $500 (R)). Thus

S = (P − Q) − R = ($5,000 − $4,000) − $500 = $500

- If, however, the share price never drops below the strike price (in this case, $50), then Trader A would not exercise the option (because selling a stock to Trader B at $50 would cost Trader A more than that to buy it). Trader A's option would be worthless and he would have lost the whole investment, the fee (premium) for the option contract, $500 ($5 per share, 100 shares per contract). Trader A's total loss is limited to the cost of the put premium plus the sales commission to buy it.

A put option is said to have intrinsic value when the underlying instrument has a spot price (S) below the option's strike price (K). Upon exercise, a put option is valued at K-S if it is "in-the-money", otherwise its value is zero. Prior to exercise, an option has time value apart from its intrinsic value. The following factors reduce the time value of a put option: shortening of the time to expire, decrease in the volatility of the underlying, and increase of interest rates. Option pricing is a central problem of financial mathematics.

== See also ==
- Call option
- Naked put
- Covered option
- Option time value
- Pre-emption right
- Put–call parity
- Right of first refusal
- CBOE S&P 500 PutWrite Index (PUT)
- Greenspan put, also called the "Fed put"
- Married put

=== Options ===
- Credit default option
- Interest rate cap and floor
- Options on futures
- Real option
