= Strike price =

Option's fixed price to exercise it on the expiration date

Strike price labeled on the graph of a call option. To the right, the option is in-the-money, and to the left, it is out-of-the-money.

In finance, the strike price (or exercise price) of an option is a fixed price at which the owner of the option can buy (in the case of a call), or sell (in the case of a put), the underlying security or commodity. The strike price may be set by reference to the spot price, which is the market price of the underlying security or commodity on the day an option is taken out. Alternatively, the strike price may be fixed at a discount or premium.

The strike price is a key variable in a derivatives contract between two parties. Where the contract requires delivery of the underlying instrument, the trade will be at the strike price, regardless of the market price of the underlying instrument at that time.

== Moneyness ==
Moneyness is the value of a financial contract if the contract settlement is financial. More specifically, it is the difference between the strike price of the option and the current trading price of its underlying security.

In options trading, terms such as in-the-money, at-the-money, and out-of-the-money describe the moneyness of options.

- A call option is in-the-money if the strike price is below the market price of the underlying stock.
- A put option is in-the-money if the strike price is above the market price of the underlying stock.
- A call or put option is at-the-money if the stock price and the exercise price are the same (or close).
- A call option is out-of-the-money if the strike price is above the market price of the underlying stock.
- A put option is out-of-the-money if the strike price is below the market price of the underlying stock.

=== Mathematical formula ===
A call option has positive monetary value at expiration when the underlying has a spot price (S) above the strike price (K). Since the option will not be exercised unless it is in-the-money, the payoff for a call option is

$$\max\left[(S-K);0\right]$$

also written as

$$(S-K)^{+} \$$

where

$$(x)^+ = \begin{cases} x & \text{if } x\ge0, \\ 0 & \text{if } x<0. \end{cases}$$

A put option has positive monetary value at expiration when the underlying has a spot price below the strike price; it is "out-the-money" otherwise, and will not be exercised. The payoff is therefore:

$$\max\left[(K-S);0\right]$$

or

$$(K-S)^{+} \$$

For a digital option payoff is $1_{S\geq K}$, where $1_{\{\}}$ is the indicator function:

$$1_{S\ge K} = \begin{cases} 1 & \text{if } S\ge K, \\ 0 & \text{otherwise.} \end{cases}$$

=== Application in startup equity ===
In privately held startups, the strike price of employee stock options is generally set to the fair market value of the company's shares at the time of grant, often determined through an independent 409A valuation in the United States. As the company's valuation grows, previously granted options with lower strike prices can create financial upside for employees.

== See also ==
- Option time value
- Intrinsic value
- Put-call parity
