= Robert Litterman =

American economist

Bob Litterman
- Born: 1951 (age 74–75)
- Spouse: Mary Litterman

Academic background
- Education: Stanford University; University of Minnesota

Academic work
- Discipline: Financial economics, asset pricing
- School or tradition: financial economics
- Institutions: Kepos Capital
- Notable ideas: Black–Litterman model
- Website: Information at IDEAS / RePEc

Robert Bruce Litterman (born 1951) is an influential finance and risk executive and researcher, best known as a developer of the Black-Litterman mathematical model for portfolio allocation.

== Biography ==
Litterman is chairman of the Risk Committee and a founding partner of Kepos Capital in New York.

Prior to Kepos Capital, Litterman spent 23 years at Goldman Sachs, where he was head of the Quantitative Resources Group in Goldman Sachs Asset Management for 11 years, starting in 1998. Prior to that position, Litterman headed the firm-wide risk department from 1994 to 1998, and prior to that he was the co-head of the model development group in the research department of the Fixed Income Division.

He received the Nicholas Molodovsky Award from the CFA Institute, the IAFE Financial Engineer of the Year Award, and was named Risk Manager of the Year by the Global Association of Risk Professionals.

He earned his undergraduate B.S. in Human Biology at Stanford University, and a Ph.D. in economics from the University of Minnesota in 1980.

== Black–Litterman model ==
At Goldman Sachs, Litterman developed the Black–Litterman model together with Fischer Black in 1990.

The model solves a seemingly simple yet perplexing problem: it is difficult to consistently estimate expected returns from various assets. The Black–Litterman model solves this problem by making expected returns an output, rather than an input, in the model. The model combines information from market equilibrium with views about returns of assets or combinations of assets, in order to generate the expected returns.

The Black–Litterman model has become one of the standard models widely used by investors around the world to optimize portfolios. Litterman is the author of Modern Investment Management: An Equilibrium Approach, together with Goldman Sachs Asset Management's Quantitative Resources Group.

== Climate policy work ==
Since retiring from Goldman Sachs in 2009, Litterman moved, together with several other former Goldman partners including Mark Tercek and Larry Linden, into the climate and environmental policy world. (Tercek was the president and CEO of The Nature Conservancy till 2019. Linden is the founder of the Linden Trust for the Environment, donating to several climate and environmental causes.)

Litterman is director of the Woodwell Climate Research Center, Resources for the Future and Climate Central. He is on the boards of the World Wildlife Fund, Julie Wrigley Global Institute of Sustainability at Arizona State University, the Woods Institute for the Environment at Stanford University, the Heller Hurwicz Economics Institute at the University of Minnesota, the Commonfund, and the Climate Leadership Council, founded by Ted Halstead.

Litterman is an advocate for a carbon tax. He created the EZ Climate carbon pricing model, joint with Columbia University's Kent Daniel and Gernot Wagner. He led the Climate-Related Market Risk Subcommittee of the Commodity Futures Trading Commission (CFTC).
