= Black model =

Financial model

The Black model (also known as the Black-76 model) is a variant of the Black–Scholes option pricing model. Its primary applications are for pricing options on future contracts, bond options, interest rate cap and floors, and swaptions. It was first presented in a paper written by Fischer Black in 1976.

It assumes that the relevant forward or futures price follows a log-normal distribution under a risk-neutral pricing measure and that the option payoff is discounted at a constant risk-free interest rate. In its standard form the model is used to price European call and put options on commodity futures, bond options, and interest rate caps and floors and swaptions.

== Background and relation to the Black–Scholes model ==
In 1976 Black published an article titled The pricing of commodity contracts in the Journal of Financial Economics in which he adapted the Black–Scholes approach to European options on commodity futures. In this setting, the underlying economic quantity is a futures price or a forward price for delivery of a commodity at a future date, rather than the spot price of a traded share.

The Black model keeps the main structural assumptions of the original Black–Scholes model. In particular, under a risk-neutral measure the relevant forward or futures price is modelled as a log-normal process with constant volatility.

Standard relationships between spot and forward prices imply that the familiar Black–Scholes formula can be recovered from the Black model when the forward price is expressed in terms of the spot price and carrying costs. For this reason the Black model is often described as a version of Black–Scholes specialised to forwards and futures, and many derivations treat it as an application of the general Black–Scholes machinery rather than as a separate theory. Details of the Black–Scholes derivation are covered in the article on the Black–Scholes model.

Options on forward rates, bond options, caps, floors and swaptions are frequently priced and quoted by assuming log-normal dynamics for the relevant forward or swap rate and then applying the Black formula. In this context the associated volatility parameter is usually reported as a Black implied volatility.

The LIBOR market model extends the basic idea by specifying joint dynamics for a family of forward rates while retaining a Black-style formula for individual caplets, floorlets and swaptions.

== The Black formula ==
Under the assumptions of the Black model, the arbitrage free price at time zero of a European call option on a futures contract can be written in terms of the current futures price and the risk-free discount factor. Let $F$ denote the current futures price for delivery at time $T'$, let $K$ be the strike price of the option, let $T \leq T'$ be the time to option expiry, let $r$ be the continuously compounded risk-free interest rate, and let $\sigma$ be the volatility of the futures price, then:

$$c = e^{-r T} \left[FN(d_1) - KN(d_2)\right]$$

The corresponding put price is

$$p = e^{-r T} \left[KN(-d_2) - FN(-d_1)\right]$$

where

$$d_1 = \frac{\ln(F/K) + \frac{1}{2}\sigma^2 T}{\sigma \sqrt{T}}$$
$$d_2 = \frac{\ln(F/K) - \frac{1}{2}\sigma^2T}{\sigma\sqrt{T}} = d_1 - \sigma\sqrt{T}$$

and $N(\cdot)$ denotes the cumulative normal distribution function of a standard normal random variable.

For an option on a forward contract that settles at a time $T'$ strictly after the option expiry $T$ the payoff is realised at $T'$, so the same expressions apply with the discount factor $e^{-rT}$ replaced by $e^{-rT'}$. When interest rates are deterministic the forward price and the futures price with the same delivery date are equal, and the formulas for options on forwards and options on futures therefore have the same functional form.

== Derivation and assumptions ==
=== Modelling assumptions ===
Under a risk-neutral pricing measure the futures or forward price process $(F_t)_{0 \leq t \leq T}$ is modelled as a geometric Brownian motion with constant volatility and zero drift. In differential form this can be written as

$$\mathrm{d}F_t = \sigma F_t \, \mathrm{d}W_t, \quad 0 \leq t \leq T,$$

where $\sigma$ is the volatility parameter and $(W_t)$ is a standard Brownian motion. This implies that $\ln F_T$ is normally distributed and that the discounted value of the option payoff can be computed by taking expectations with respect to this log-normal distribution.

=== Derivation ===
Let $X_T$ denote a payoff at time $T$. Under the risk-neutral measure the time zero price of this payoff is given by the discounted expectation

$$\text{Price}_0 = e^{-rT} \mathbb{E}[X_T],$$

where $\mathbb{E}$ denotes expectation. For a European call option on a futures contract with expiry $T$ and strike $K$ the payoff is $(F_T - K)^+$. Substituting this payoff into the pricing expression and using the log-normal distribution of $F_T$ leads, after integration, to the closed form formulas for the call and put prices.

An alternative derivation views the call on a futures or forward contract as an option to exchange one asset for another. Under this approach, the option holder has the right at expiry to receive the futures payoff and pay the fixed amount $K$, which can be represented as an exchange between a position linked to the futures contract and a zero coupon bond. Under the log-normal assumptions of the Black model and with deterministic interest rates, this exchange option can be valued using Margrabe's formula, and the result reduces to the Black pricing formula for options on forwards and futures.

== Applications ==
The Black model is widely used for options on futures and forwards in commodity and fixed income markets.

=== Futures and commodity options ===
In commodity and financial futures markets the Black model underlies the pricing of exchange traded and over the counter options on futures. Examples include options on crude oil futures, metal futures and equity index futures. Exchanges and dealers often treat the volatility parameter in the Black formula as the primary quoted quantity and convert between option prices and so called Black implied volatilities when comparing contracts with different strikes and maturities. Volatility surfaces built from these implied volatilities provide a way to summarise option prices across a range of expiries and strike levels.

=== Caps, floors and bond options ===
In fixed income markets the Black framework is used for bond options and for caps and floors. A cap or floor can be decomposed into individual caplets or floorlets. Each component has a payoff that depends on a single forward interest rate over a specified accrual period. Under the assumption that the relevant forward rate is log-normal under an appropriate pricing measure each caplet or floorlet is valued by applying the Black formula to that forward rate and scaling by the notional and accrual factor. Market participants quote cap and floor prices in terms of Black implied volatilities for standard maturities and strike levels.

=== Swaptions and forward rate models ===
European swaptions are treated in a similar spirit. The underlying variable is a forward swap rate and prices for swaptions across different maturities and tenors are commonly quoted in terms of Black implied volatilities. In log-normal forward rate models the Black formula remains the basic building block for valuing individual caplets, floorlets and swaptions. The model specifies joint dynamics for a family of forward rates and is calibrated so that it reproduces observed Black or normal implied volatility surfaces used in swaption and cap markets.

=== Inflation-linked caps and floors on RPI for pension increases ===
In the United Kingdom many defined benefit pension schemes provide increases that are linked to the RPI or CPI, subject to an annual floor and cap, a structure known as limited price indexation and often written as LPI($a$,$b$). A typical benefit might promise annual increases in line with RPI subject to a floor of $0\%$ and a cap of $5\%$, denoted LPI(0,5). These guarantees can be valued or hedged using inflation derivatives such as RPI swaps and inflation caps and floors.

For a single year let $I$ denote the random annual RPI inflation rate expressed as a proportion. With a floor $a$ and cap $b$ on the annual increase the limited price indexation rate can be written as

$$L(I) = \min\bigl(\max(I,a), b\bigr).$$

Using the notation $x^+ = \max(x,0)$ this decomposes as

$$L(I) = I - (I - b)^+ + (a - I)^+.$$

The second term removes outcomes where inflation is above the cap, and the third term replaces very low inflation outcomes with the floor level.

To obtain a tractable formula, assume that under a pricing measure the one year inflation rate $I$ is strictly positive and log normal with forward mean $F$, volatility $\sigma$ and time to maturity $T$. This is the same log normal setup used earlier for the Black formula, with $F$ playing the role of the forward price and the cap and floor strikes playing the role of the option strike. Under this assumption

$$\mathbb{E}[L(I)] = F - \mathbb{E}\bigl[(I - b)^+\bigr] + \mathbb{E}\bigl[(a - I)^+\bigr].$$

For a strike $K$ define

$$d_1^{(K)} = \frac{\ln(F/K) + \tfrac{1}{2}\sigma^2 T}{\sigma \sqrt{T}}, \quad d_2^{(K)} = d_1^{(K)} - \sigma \sqrt{T},$$

and let $N$ denote the cumulative distribution function of a standard normal random variable. Ignoring discounting over a single year, the corresponding call and put expectations are

$$\mathbb{E}\bigl[(I - K)^+\bigr] = F N\bigl(d_1^{(K)}\bigr) - K N\bigl(d_2^{(K)}\bigr),$$
$$\mathbb{E}\bigl[(K - I)^+\bigr] = K N\bigl(-d_2^{(K)}\bigr) - F N\bigl(-d_1^{(K)}\bigr),$$

which mirror the Black call and put formulas in the formula section, with the exponential discount factor omitted for simplicity.

For general LPI($a$,$b$) this gives

$$\mathbb{E}[L(I)] = F - \bigl(F N\bigl(d_1^{(b)}\bigr) - b N\bigl(d_2^{(b)}\bigr)\bigr) + \bigl(a N\bigl(-d_2^{(a)}\bigr) - F N\bigl(-d_1^{(a)}\bigr)\bigr),$$

Expected one-year LPI(0,5) increase as a function of the forward one-year RPI rate under a normal (Bachelier) model. The straight line shows the deterministic LPI(0,5) when volatility is zero, curved lines show the expected increase for different volatility assumptions, the thin horizontal lines mark the floor at 0% and the cap at 5%, and the horizontal line at 2.5% shows the limiting expected rate as volatility tends to infinity.

where $d_1^{(a)}$, $d_2^{(a)}$ use strike $a$ and $d_1^{(b)}$, $d_2^{(b)}$ use strike $b$.

As an illustration consider a one year LPI(0,5) structure with a forward RPI inflation rate of $3.5\%$, so $F = 0.035$, a cap $b = 0.05$, a floor $a = 0$, volatility parameter $\sigma = 0.02$ and $T = 1$. Under the log normal model the floor term is zero, since $I$ is strictly positive, and

$$\mathbb{E}[L(I)] = F - \bigl(F N\bigl(d_1^{(0.05)}\bigr) - 0.05 N\bigl(d_2^{(0.05)}\bigr)\bigr).$$

With $F$ substantially below the cap relative to the assumed log normal volatility, the cap rarely bites, the call term is very small, and the expected LPI(0,5) increase is therefore very close to the forward inflation rate of $3.5\%$.

It is common to approximate the one year inflation rate by a normal random variable, in line with the Bachelier model, especially when negative inflation is considered. Under that normal model, with the same central assumption $F = 3.5\%$, volatility $\sigma = 2\%$ and LPI(0,5), the expectation $\mathbb{E}[L(I)]$ is lower, approximately $3.27\%$, because both the cap at $5\%$ and the floor at $0\%$ are active over a wider range of outcomes.

== Limitations and extensions ==
In liquid markets, option prices across strikes and maturities typically display volatility smiles and skews, so a single volatility parameter in the Black formula cannot reproduce the full implied volatility surface for caps, floors or swaptions.

The log-normal specification also implies that forward rates, futures prices and swap rates remain strictly positive. In periods of very low or negative interest rates this conflicts with observed market behaviour and the standard Black formula can misprice options by assigning zero probability to negative outcomes that actually occur. To deal with this, practitioners often use shifted log-normal models or adopt a normal model such as the Bachelier model, which allows the underlying rate to take negative values.

Local volatility and stochastic volatility models, including the SABR volatility model, are used to fit observed cap and swaption volatility smiles. Multi-factor term structure models such as the LIBOR market model specify joint dynamics for a family of forward rates and are calibrated so that their prices match the Black or normal implied volatilities quoted in the market.

== See also ==
- Financial mathematics
- Black–Scholes
- Description of applications
  - Bond option § Valuation
  - Futures contract § Options on futures
  - Interest rate cap and floor § Black model
  - Swaption § Valuation
