= Black's approximation =

Method for estimating a call option value

In finance, Black's approximation is an approximate method for computing the value of an American call option on a stock paying a single dividend. It was described by Fischer Black in 1975.

The Black–Scholes formula (hereinafter, "BS Formula") provides an explicit equation for the value of a call option on a non-dividend paying stock. In case the stock pays one or more discrete dividend(s) no closed formula is known, but several approximations can be used, or else the Black–Scholes PDE will have to be solved numerically. One such approximation is described here. See also Black–Scholes model#American options.

The method essentially entails using the BS formula to compute the value of two European call options:
(1) A European call with the same maturity as the American call being valued, but with the stock price reduced by the present value of the dividend, and
(2) A European call that expires on the day before the dividend is to be paid. The largest of (1) and (2) is taken as the approximate value for the American call. See example aside. The resulting value is sometimes called the "pseudo American" value of the call.

== Application ==
Consider an American call option with ex-dividend dates in 3 months and 5 months, and has an expiration date of 6 months. The dividend on each ex-dividend date is expected to payout $0.70. Additional information is presented below. Find the value of the American call option.

$$\begin{align}
S_0 &= \$40 \\
X &= \$40 \\
\sigma &= 30\% \; p.a. \\
r &= 10\% \; p.a. \\
T &= 6 \; months = .5 \; years\\
D &= \$0.70 \\
\end{align}$$

First, we need to calculate based on the two methods provided above in the methods section. Here we will calculate both of the parts:

(1) This is the first method calculation, which states:
A European call with the same maturity as the American call being valued, but with the stock price reduced by the present value of the dividend.
$$\begin{align}
PV &= D_1 e^{-(r)(\frac{\Delta t_1}{m})} + D_2 e^{-(r)(\frac{\Delta t_2}{m})}
\end{align}$$
where

$PV$ is the net present value of the dividends at the ex-dividend dates (we use the ex-dividend dates because on this date the stock price declines by the amount of the dividend)
$D_{1,2}$ are the dividends on the ex-dividend dates
$r$ is the risk-free rate of the market, which we will assume to be constant for this example
$\Delta t_{1,2}$ amount of time until the ex-dividend date
$m$ a division factor to bring the Δt to a full year. (example $\Delta t$ = 2 months, $m$ = 12 months, therefore $\frac{\Delta t}{m}$ = 2/12 = .166667)
$e$ is the exponential function.

Applying this formula to the question:
$$\begin{align}
0.7e^{-(.1)(\frac{3}{12})} + 0.7e^{-(.1)(\frac{5}{12})} = 1.3541
\end{align}$$
The option price can therefore be calculated using the Black-Scholes-Merton model where will discount the dividends from $S_0$ which I will denote by $S_0 '$ for the new value:
$$S_0 ' = 40 - 1.3541 = 38.6459$$
The rest of the variables remain the same. Now we need to calculate d_{1} and d_{2} using these formula's
$$\begin{align}
C &= S_0 N(d_1) - Xe^{-r(T)} N(d_2) \\
d_1 &= \frac{\left[\ln\left(\frac{S_0}{X}\right) + \left(r + \frac{\sigma^2}{2}\right)(T)\right]}{\sigma\sqrt{T}} \\
d_2 &=  d_1 - \sigma\sqrt{T}
\end{align}$$
where,

$N(\cdot)$ is the cumulative distribution function of the standard normal distribution
$T$ is the time to maturity
$S_0$ is the current price of the underlying asset
$X$ is the strike price
$r$ is the risk free rate (annual rate, expressed in terms of continuous compounding)
$\sigma$ is the volatility of returns of the underlying asset

Inputting the values we get:
$$\begin{align}
d_1 &= \frac{\left[\ln\left(\frac{38.6459}{40}\right) + \left(0.1 + \frac{0.3^2}{2}\right)(0.5)\right]}{0.3\sqrt{0.5}} = 0.1794                \\
d_2 &=  0.1794 - 0.3\sqrt{0.5} = -0.0327 \\
N(d_1) &= 0.5712   \\
N(d_2) &= 0.4870  \\
C &= 38.6459(0.5712) - 40e^{-0.1(0.5)} (0.4870) = 3.5446 \approx \$ 3.54
\end{align}$$

(2) This is the second method calculation, which states:

A European call that expires on the day before the dividend is to be paid.
This method begins just like the previous method except that this options maturity is set to the last maturity before the last dividend (meaning the second dividend in the fifth month):
$$\begin{align}
PV &= D_1 e^{-(r)(\frac{\Delta t_1}{m})}
\end{align}$$
For the most part, the variables remain same except for the time to maturity, which equals:
$$\begin{align}
T &= 5 \; months = .4167 \; years
\end{align}$$
$$\begin{align}
PV &= 0.7 e^{-(0.1)(\frac{3}{12})} = 0.6827 \\
S_0 ' &= 40 - 0.6827 = 39.3173 \\
d_1 &= \frac{\left[\ln\left(\frac{39.3173}{40}\right) + \left(0.1 + \frac{0.3^2}{2}\right)(0.4167)\right]}{0.3\sqrt{0.4167}} = 0.2231                \\
d_2 &= 0.2231 - 0.3\sqrt{0.4167} = 0.0294 \\
N(d_1) &= 0.5883   \\
N(d_2) &= 0.5117  \\
C &= 39.3173(0.5883) - 40e^{-0.1(0.4167)} (0.5117) = 3.4997 \approx \$ 3.50
\end{align}$$

Recalling method (1) price of $\$ 3.54 > \$ 3.50$ from method (2), we see that the price of the American call option, as per Fisher Black's approximation, is the greater of the two methods, therefore, the price of the option = $\$ 3.54$.
