= Case Sprenkle =

Case M. Sprenkle (1934-2026) was a monetary economist, serving as Professor at the University of Illinois until 2016. He is known for his early contributions to option pricing theory. A revision of his doctoral thesis, since widely cited, was published in 1961: Here, Sprenkle "developed the first modern model of option pricing and was used as the foundation of the equilibrium pricing model developed by Black and Scholes". Professor Sprenkle's later research focused on the demand for money, and on optimal monetary policy under various sources of uncertainty. He received his PhD from Yale University in 1960, with his BA in 1956 from the University of Colorado Boulder.
