= Goldman Sachs asset management factor model =

Investment model

The Goldman Sachs asset management (GSAM) factor model is a quantitative investment model used by financial analysts to assess the potential performance and risk of company. There are various types of factor models – statistical models, macroeconomic models and fundamental models. While Goldman Sachs employs several, that described below is of the latter type.

The quantitative model here uses company and industry attributes, as well as market data, to explain a company's historical returns: relationships are derived based on inputs obtained from financial statements coupled with observed share performance. (Since published financials may be questionable or the data may not be comparable over time, this model includes a factor based on an assessment by an equity analyst performing traditional fundamental analysis). Specifically, the model incorporates the following:

- (A). Value
  - i. Book/price
  - ii. Retained EPS/price
  - iii EBITD/enterprise value
- (B). Growth and momentum
  - i. Estimate revisions
  - ii. Price momentum
  - iii. Sustainable growth
- (C). Risk
  - i. Beta
  - ii. Residual risk
  - iii. Disappointment risk
