= Short-term interest rates =

Numerous articles relate to short-term interest rates, including:

- Bank rate
- Certificate of deposit
- Discount window
- Eurodollar
- Federal funds rate
- Libor
- Official bank rate of the United Kingdom
- Overnight rate
- Payday loan
- Primary dealer
- Prime rate
- Repurchase agreement, also known as "Repo"
- TED spread
- Treasury bill
- Vigorish
- Yield curve
