= Fischer Black =

American financial economist (1938–1995)

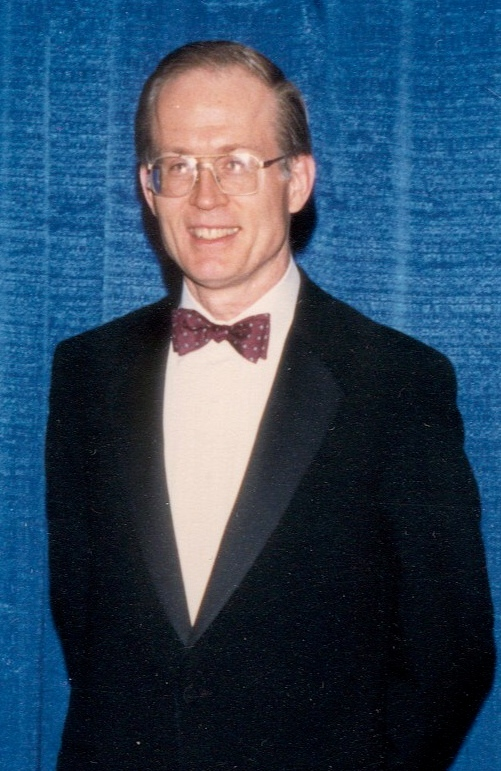
- Born: Fischer Sheffey Black Jr. January 11, 1938; Washington, D.C., U.S.
- Died: August 30, 1995 (aged 57); New Canaan, Connecticut, U.S.
- Education: Harvard University (BA, PhD)
- Known for: Black–Scholes equation Black-76 model Black–Derman–Toy model Black–Karasinski model Black–Litterman model Black's approximation Treynor–Black model
- Awards: 1994, IAFE Financial Engineer of the Year
- Scientific career
- Fields: Economics; Mathematical finance
- Workplaces: University of Chicago Booth School of Business, Arthur D. Little, MIT Sloan School of Management, Goldman Sachs
- Doctoral students: René M. Stulz

Fischer Sheffey Black, Jr. (January 11, 1938 – August 30, 1995) was an American economist, best known as one of the co-authors of the Black–Scholes option pricing model. He held academic positions at the University of Chicago and the Massachusetts Institute of Technology, later working at Goldman Sachs. In addition to his work on option pricing, Black made important contributions to the development of the capital asset pricing model (CAPM). He also proposed ideas in monetary economics and in theories of the business cycle.

Black died in 1995, at the age of 57. Two years after his death, the 1997 Nobel Memorial Prize in Economic Sciences was awarded to his collaborator Myron Scholes and colleague Robert C. Merton for the development of the Black–Scholes model and its extension to a continuous-time framework. Because the prize is not awarded posthumously, Black was ineligible for the award.

== Biography ==
Fischer Sheffey Black, Jr was born on January 11, 1938 in the Georgetown neighborhood of Washington, D.C. He graduated from Harvard College with a major in physics in 1959. He was initially indecisive about a thesis topic for a Harvard PhD, having switched from physics to mathematics, then to computers and artificial intelligence. Black spent a summer developing his ideas at the RAND corporation. He was also a student of MIT professor Marvin Minsky and was able to submit his research for completion of a PhD in applied mathematics from Harvard University in 1964.

After Harvard, Black joined the consultancy Bolt, Beranek and Newman, working on a system for artificial intelligence, but left in late 1965 to join the public accounting firm of Arthur D. Little. This is where he was first exposed to economic and financial consulting and met his future collaborator, Jack Treynor. In 1971, Black was appointed as a visiting professor at the University of Chicago, Graduate School of Business, then as a full professor from 1972 to 1975. He left the University of Chicago in 1975 to teach as a professor at the MIT Sloan School of Management in Cambridge, Massachusetts. In 1984, he joined Goldman Sachs, and was made a partner by 1986. Black became the Director of the Quantitative Strategies Group at Goldman, where he worked until his death.

== Financial economics career ==
While at Arthur D. Little, Black began thinking seriously about monetary policy. The major question at the time was between two schools of economic thought, the Keynesians and monetarists. The Keynesians (under the leadership of Franco Modigliani) believe there is a natural tendency of the credit markets toward instability, toward boom and bust, and they assign both monetary and fiscal policy roles in damping down this cycle, working toward the goal of smooth sustainable growth. In the Keynesian view, central bankers must have discretionary powers to fulfill their role. Monetarists, under the leadership of Milton Friedman, believe that discretionary central banking is the problem, not the solution. Friedman believed that growth of the money supply could, and should, be set at a constant rate, to accommodate predictable growth in real GDP.

Treynor was one of the developers, along with William F. Sharpe, of the Capital Asset Pricing Model (CAPM) (for which they won the Nobel Prize in Economics in 1990). Black started working on the CAPM with Treynor in the late 1960s, while they were both at accounting firm, Arthur D. Little. One of the classic papers of Black, Jensen, and Scholes on the testing of the capital asset pricing model (CAPM). was published in 1972. The key insight of the CAPM was that the excess return of an individual stock (over the risk-free rate) is proportional (the so-called beta of the stock) to the excess return of the stock-market. Black viewed the excess return on an individual stock as being linked to the riskiness of that stock, otherwise no-one would buy the stock. He extended this idea into pricing options. Black concluded that discretionary monetary policy could not do the good that Keynesians wanted it to do. He concluded that monetary policy should be passive within an economy. But he also concluded that it could not do the harm monetarists feared it would do. Black said in a letter to Friedman, in January 1972:

In the U.S. economy, much of the public debt is in the form of Treasury bills. Each week, some of these bills mature, and new bills are sold. If the Federal Reserve System tries to inject money into the private sector, the private sector will simply turn around and exchange its money for Treasury bills at the next auction. If the Federal Reserve withdraws money, the private sector will allow some of its Treasury bills to mature without replacing them.

In 1973, Black, along with Myron Scholes, published the paper 'The Pricing of Options and Corporate Liabilities' in The Journal of Political Economy. This was his most famous work and included the Black–Scholes equation.

In March 1976, Black proposed that human capital and business have "ups and downs that are largely unpredictable [...] because of basic uncertainty about what people will want in the future and about what the economy will be able to produce in the future. If future tastes and technology were known, profits and wages would grow smoothly and surely over time." A boom is a period when technology matches well with demand. A bust is a period of mismatch. This view made Black an early contributor to real business cycle theory.

Economist Tyler Cowen has argued that Black's work on monetary economics and business cycles can be used to explain the Great Recession.

Black's works on monetary theory, business cycles and options are parts of his vision of a unified framework. He once stated:

I like the beauty and symmetry in Mr. Treynor's equilibrium models so much that I started designing them myself. I worked on models in several areas: Monetary theory, Business cycles, Options and warrants. For 20 years, I have been struggling to show people the beauty in these models to pass on knowledge I received from Mr. Treynor. In monetary theory --- the theory of how money is related to economic activity --- I am still struggling. In business cycle theory --- the theory of fluctuation in the economy --- I am still struggling. In options and warrants, though, people see the beauty.

It has been claimed that the mathematical techniques developed in the option theory can be extended to provide a mathematical analysis of monetary theory and business cycles as well.

== Business Cycles and Equilibrium ==
Fischer Black's best-known book is Business Cycles and Equilibrium, originally published in 1987. In this book, Black proposes at the beginning of the book to imagine a world where money does not exist, and develops a theory that economic and financial markets are in a continual equilibrium. Building upon these statements, Black creates models as well as challenges monetary theorists, especially those who subscribe to the ideas of the quantity theory of money and liquidity of money. Banks are the main institutions of monetary transactions in Black's book, to which he also states that money is an endogenous resource (contrary to monetarists who believe money to be an exogenous resource), provided by banks due to profit maximization. Controversial statements such as "Monetary and exchange rate policies accomplish almost nothing, and fiscal policies are unimportant in causing or changing business cycles" have been contested by Keynesians and monetarists alike.

== Illness and death ==
In early 1994, Black was diagnosed with throat cancer. Surgery at first appeared successful, and Black was well enough to attend the annual meeting of the International Association of Financial Engineers that October, where he received their award as Financial Engineer of the Year. However, the cancer returned, and Black died in August 1995. He was survived by his wife, Catherine, and their five children.

== Posthumous recognition ==
The Nobel Prize is not given posthumously, so it was not awarded to Black in 1997 when his co-author Scholes received the honor for their landmark work on option pricing along with Robert C. Merton, another pioneer in the development of valuation of stock options. However, when announcing the award that year, the Nobel committee did prominently mention Black's key role.

Black received recognition as the co-author of the Black–Derman–Toy interest rate derivatives model, which was developed for in-house use by Goldman Sachs in the mid-1980s, but was eventually published in 1990. He also co-authored the Black–Litterman model on global asset allocation while at Goldman Sachs.

In December 1996, Black was inducted to the Fixed Income Analysts Society Hall of Fame, with his colleague Emanuel Derman conducting the ceremonies and delivering the inductee speech.

The advisory board of The Journal of Performance Measurement inducted Black into the Performance & Risk Measurement Hall of Fame in 2017. The announcement appears in the Winter 2016/2017 issue of the journal. The Hall of Fame recognizes individuals who have made significant contributions to investment performance and risk measurement.

== Fischer Black Prize ==
In 2002, the American Finance Association established the biennially awarded Fischer Black Prize in memory of Fischer Black. The award is given to a young researcher whose body of work "best exemplifies the Fischer Black hallmark of developing original research that is relevant to finance practice".

== See also ==
- Shadow rate - A concept created by Fischer Black in "Interest Rates as Options"

== Selected bibliography ==
- F. Black, Myron Scholes, & Michael Jensen, "The Capital-Asset Pricing Model: Some empirical tests", in Studies in the Theory of Capital Markets (1972).
- F. Black, "Active and Passive Monetary Policy in a Neoclassical Model", The Journal of Finance, Vol. 27, No. 4 (Sep., 1972), pp. 801–814.
- F. Black, "Fact and Fantasy in the Use of Options", Financial Analysts Journal 31, pp36–41, 61–72 (July/August 1975).
- F. Black, "Noise", Journal of Finance, vol. 41, pp. 529–543 (1986).
- Fischer Black, Business Cycles and Equilibrium, Basil Blackwell, 1987. ISBN 0470499176
- Fischer Black, Exploring General Equilibrium, MIT Press, 1995. ISBN 0262514095
