= Bachelier model =

Economic model for asset prices

The Bachelier model is a model of an asset price under Brownian motion presented by Louis Bachelier in his PhD thesis The Theory of Speculation (French: Théorie de la spéculation), published 1900. It is also called the normal model equivalently (as opposed to log-normal model or Black–Scholes model). One early criticism of the Bachelier model is that the probability distribution which he chose to use to describe stock prices allowed for negative prices. (His doctoral dissertation was graded down because of that feature.) The (much) later Black–Scholes–(Merton) model addresses that issue by positing stock prices as following a log-normal distribution which does not allow negative values. This in turn, implies that returns follow a normal distribution.

On April 8, 2020, the CME Group posted the note CME Clearing Plan to Address the Potential of a Negative Underlying in Certain Energy Options Contracts, saying that after a threshold on price, it would change its standard energy options model from one based on geometric Brownian motion and the Black–Scholes model to the Bachelier model. On April 20, 2020, oil futures reached negative values for the first time in history, where Bachelier model took an important role in option pricing and risk management. The CME Group has since switched back to the Black–Scholes model. Research shows that the Bachelier model is not statistically better than the Black–Scholes model, with an artificial neural network outperforming both when pricing European call options.

The European analytic formula for this model based on a risk neutral argument is derived in Analytic Formula for the European Normal Black Scholes Formula (Kazuhiro Iwasawa, New York University, December 2, 2001).

The implied volatility under the Bachelier model can be obtained by an accurate numerical approximation.

For an extensive review of the Bachelier model, see the review paper, A Black-Scholes User's Guide to the Bachelier Model, which summarizes the results on volatility conversion, risk management, stochastic volatility, and barrier options pricing to facilitate the model transition. The paper also connects the Black-Scholes and Bachelier models by using the displaced Black-Scholes model as a model family. For a comparison of the Bachelier model and the Black-Scholes model versus a deep layer artificial neural network, see the paper A comparative analysis of option pricing models: Black-Scholes, Bachelier, and artificial neural networks (Gross, et al., 2025).
