= Pirum =

UK-based financial services technology vendor

Pirum Systems Ltd
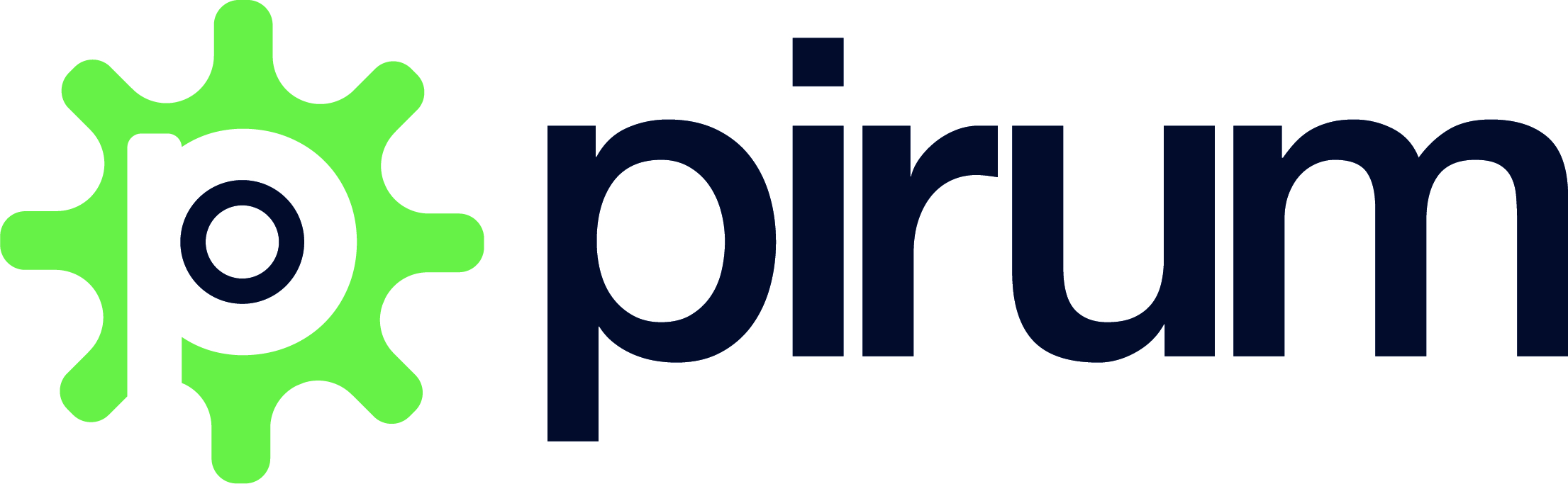
- Company type: Private company
- Industry: Financial services
- Founded: 2000; 26 years ago
- Headquarters: London, EC2; United Kingdom
- Services: Securities Lending Technology Vendor
- Number of employees: 100
- Website: pirum.com

Pirum is a UK-based financial services technology vendor, headquartered in the City of London. Pirum was co-founded in 2000 as a securities lending post trade vendor, specializing initially in the reconciliation of open and pending securities lending trades and billing. Over the years, the product offering has expanding into collateral services and other areas that required automation. Pirum's client base includes over 100 financial institutions including investment banks, asset managers, pension funds, insurance companies and Agent Lenders (companies who lend assets on behalf of other parties).

== History ==
Prior to 2000, securities lending was a growing business with most financial service employees based onshore (ie. in North America, UK, Europe, Tokyo, Hong Kong, Australia etc). In 2000, demand started to arise for automation and standardisation amongst those financial institutions. In June 2000, Pirum Systems was founded in London by Rupert Perry and Jeff Armstrong with the objective of providing automated internet-based solutions for these market participants, through providing a secure reconciliation service for both open securities lending trades and for their monthly billing.

Pirum is the Latin name for pear tree and was used as the company name because PEAR derives from the names of Pirum's founders: Rupert PErry and Jeff ARmstrong.

== Services ==
Pirum provides the following automation services to its clients:

=== Core ===
- Open and pending trade compare
- Custody reconciliations
- Billing comparison
- Billing delivery

=== Pirum Live ===
- Mark to market functionality
- Collateral and RQV services, with links to BNY Mellon, JP Morgan Chase and Euroclear Triparties
- Returns automation
- CCP functionality with Eurex
- Data services with Markit
- Cash prepay reconciliations

The real-time Live services are used by more than 30 of Pirum's clients.

== Involvement in the global industry ==
Pirum are an associate member of the International Securities Lending Association (ISLA), and regularly attend and/or sponsor industry events.

== New ownership ==
In February 2015, Five Arrows Principal Investments, the mid-market private equity fund backed by the Rothschild Group, and Camwell Management LLP agreed to acquire an interest in Pirum. The two co-founders of Pirum, Rupert Perry and Jeff Armstrong, remained with Pirum as shareholders, whilst Donal Smith joined Pirum's board of directors as non-executive chairman, and Rajen Sheth became CEO.
