= Short (finance) =

Selling unowned financial securities

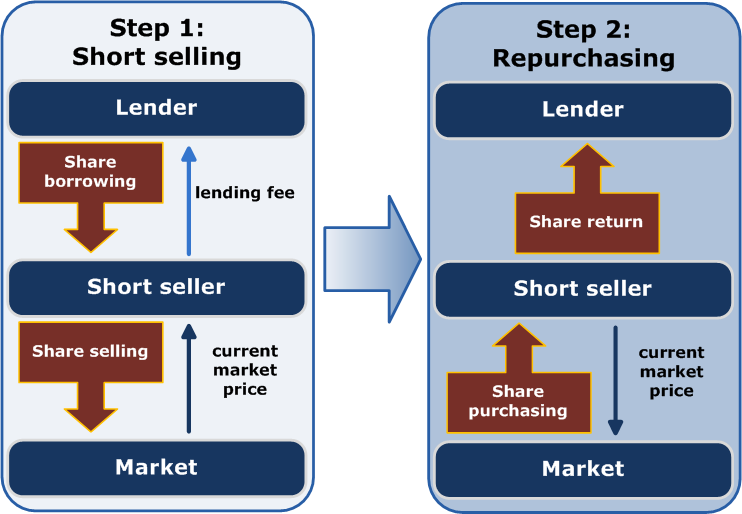
Schematic representation of physical short selling in two steps. The short seller borrows shares and immediately sells them. The short seller then expects the price to decrease, after which the seller can profit by purchasing the shares to return to the lender.

In finance, being short in an asset means investing in such a way that the investor will profit if the market value of the asset falls. This is the opposite of the more common long position, where the investor will profit if the market value of the asset rises. An investor that sells an asset short is, as to that asset, a short seller.

There are a number of ways of achieving a short position. The most fundamental is physical selling short or short-selling, by which the short seller borrows an asset (typically a fungible security such as a share or a bond) and sells it. The short seller must later buy the same amount of the asset to return it to the lender. If the market price of the asset has fallen in the meantime, the short seller will have made a profit equal to the difference in price. Conversely, if the price has risen then the short seller will bear a loss. The short seller usually must pay a borrowing fee to borrow the asset (charged at a particular rate over time, similar to an interest payment) and reimburse the lender for any cash return (such as a dividend or interest) that would have been paid on the asset while borrowed.

A short position can also be created through a futures, forward, or option contract, by which the short seller assumes an obligation or right to sell an asset at a future date at a price stated in the contract. If the price of the asset falls below the contract price, the short seller can buy it at the lower market value and then sell it at the higher price specified in the contract, and thereby benefit from the lower price. A short position can also be achieved through certain types of swap, such as a contract for difference, which is an agreement between two parties to pay each other the difference if the price of an asset rises or falls, under which the party that will benefit if the price falls will have a short position.

Because a short seller can incur a liability to the lender if the price rises, and because a short sale is normally done through a broker, a short seller is typically required to post margin to its broker as collateral to ensure that any such liabilities can be met, and to post additional margin if losses begin to accrue. For analogous reasons, short positions in derivatives also usually involve the posting of margin with the counterparty. A failure to post margin when required may prompt the broker or counterparty to close the position at the then-current price.

Short selling is a common practice in public securities, futures, and currency markets where the assets are fungible and reasonably liquid. It is otherwise uncommon, because a short seller needs to be confident that it will be able to repurchase the right quantity of the asset at or around the market price when it decides to close the position.

A short sale may have a variety of objectives. Speculators may sell short hoping to realize a profit on an instrument that appears overvalued, just as long investors or speculators hope to profit from a rise in the price of an instrument that appears undervalued. Alternatively, traders or fund managers may use offsetting short positions to hedge certain risks that exist in a long position or a portfolio.

Advocates of short selling argue that the practice is an essential part of the price discovery mechanism, but short selling is subject to criticism and periodically faces hostility from society and policymakers because it is perceived to put downward pressure on prices. Nevertheless, research indicates that banning short selling is ineffective and has negative effects on markets.

== Concept ==
=== Physical shorting with borrowed securities ===
To profit from a decrease in the price of a security, a short seller can borrow the security and sell it, expecting that it will be cheaper to repurchase in the future. When the seller decides that the time is right (or when the lender recalls the securities), the seller buys the same number of equivalent securities and returns them to the lender. The act of buying back the securities that were sold short is called covering the short, covering the position or simply covering. A short position can be covered at any time before the securities are due to be returned. Once the position is covered, the short seller is not affected by subsequent rises or falls in the price of the securities, for it already holds the securities that it will return to the lender.

The process relies on the fact that the securities (or the other assets being sold short) are fungible. An investor therefore "borrows" securities in the same sense as one borrows a $10 bill, where the legal ownership of the money is transferred to the borrower and it can be freely disposed of, and different bank notes or coins can be returned to the lender. This can be contrasted with the sense in which one borrows a bicycle, where the ownership of the bicycle does not change and the same bicycle must be returned, not merely one that is the same model.

Because the price of a share is theoretically unlimited, the potential losses of a short-seller are also theoretically unlimited.

==== Worked example of a profitable short sale ====
Shares in ACME Inc. currently trade at $10 per share.

1. A short seller borrows from a lender 100 shares of ACME Inc., and immediately sells them for a total of $1,000.
2. Subsequently, the price of the shares falls to $8 per share.
3. Short seller now buys 100 shares of ACME Inc. for $800.
4. Short seller returns the shares to the lender, who must accept the return of the same number of shares as was lent despite the fact that the market value of the shares has decreased.
5. Short seller keeps as its profit the $200 difference between the price at which the short seller sold the borrowed shares and the lower price at which the short seller purchased the equivalent shares (minus borrowing fees paid to the lender).

==== Worked example of a loss-making short sale ====
Shares in ACME Inc. currently trade at $10 per share.

1. A short seller borrows 100 shares of ACME Inc., and sells them for a total of $1,000.
2. Subsequently, the price of the shares rises to $25 per share.
3. Short seller is required to return the shares, and is compelled to buy 100 shares of ACME Inc. for $2,500.
4. Short seller returns the shares to the lender, who accepts the return of the same number of shares as was lent.
5. Short seller incurs as a loss the $1,500 difference between the price at which they sold the borrowed shares and the higher price at which the short seller had to purchase the equivalent shares (plus any borrowing fees).

=== Synthetic shorting with derivatives ===
"Shorting" or "going short" (and sometimes also "short selling") also refer more broadly to any transaction used by an investor to profit from the decline in price of a borrowed asset or financial instrument. Derivatives contracts that can be used in this way include futures, options, and swaps. These contracts are typically cash-settled, meaning that no buying or selling of the asset in question is actually involved in the contract, although typically one side of the contract will be a broker that will effect a back-to-back sale of the asset in question in order to hedge their position.

== History ==
The practice of short selling was likely invented in 1609 by Dutch businessman Isaac Le Maire, a sizeable shareholder of the Dutch East India Company (Vereenigde Oostindische Compagnie or VOC in Dutch).

The London banking house of Neal, James, Fordyce and Down collapsed in June 1772, precipitating a major crisis that included the collapse of almost every private bank in Scotland, and a liquidity crisis in the two major banking centres of the world, London and Amsterdam. The bank had been speculating by shorting East India Company stock on a massive scale, apparently using customer deposits to cover losses.

The term short in the financial sense has been in use from at least the mid-nineteenth century. The word is used, in the sense of "lacking", because the short seller is in a deficit position with their brokerage house regarding the securities that they have borrowed.

Jacob Little, known as The Great Bear of Wall Street, began shorting stocks in the United States in 1822.

Short sellers were one of the groups blamed for the Wall Street crash of 1929. Regulations governing short selling were implemented in the United States in 1929 and in 1940. Political fallout from the 1929 crash led Congress to enact a law banning short sellers from selling shares during a downtick; this was known as the uptick rule and was in effect until 3 July 2007, when it was removed by the Securities and Exchange Commission (SEC Release No. 34-55970). President Herbert Hoover condemned short sellers and even J. Edgar Hoover said he would investigate short sellers for their role in prolonging the Depression.

In 1949, Alfred Winslow Jones founded an unregulated fund that bought stocks whilst selling other stocks short, hence hedging some of the market risk; it is generally considered to be the first hedge fund, a term which dates to 1966.

George Soros was blamed for "breaking the Bank of England" on Black Wednesday in 1992, when he sold short more than $10 billion worth of pounds sterling.

During the 2008 financial crisis, critics argued that investors taking large short positions in struggling financial firms like Lehman Brothers, HBOS and Morgan Stanley created instability in the stock market and placed additional downward pressure on prices. In response, a number of countries introduced restrictive regulations on short-selling in 2008 and 2009. Naked short selling is the practice of short-selling a tradable asset without first borrowing the security or ensuring that the security can be borrowed, intending to do so after agreeing the sale in order to be able to settle with the settlement period (typically one or two days) –it was this practice that was commonly restricted. Investors argued that it was the weakness of financial institutions, not short-selling, that drove stocks to fall. In September 2008, the Securities Exchange Commission in the United States abruptly banned short sales, primarily in financial stocks, to protect companies under siege in the stock market. That ban expired several weeks later as regulators determined the ban was not stabilizing the price of stocks.

Temporary short-selling bans were also introduced in the United Kingdom, Germany, France, Italy and other European countries in 2008 to minimal effect. Australia moved to ban naked short selling entirely in September 2008. Germany placed a ban on naked short selling of certain Eurozone securities in 2010. Spain, Portugal and Italy introduced short selling bans in 2011 and again in 2012.

During the COVID-19 pandemic, shorting was severely restricted or temporarily banned, with European market watchdogs tightening the rules on short selling "in an effort to stem the historic losses arising from the coronavirus pandemic".

In addition to attempted bans, regulators in many jurisdictions (including the European Union and the United Kingdom) require the disclosure of short positions, in order to improve the information in the market regarding the extent of the short interest in particular companies.

Worldwide, economic regulators seem inclined to restrict short selling to decrease potential downward price cascades. Investors continue to argue this only contributes to market inefficiency.

== Mechanism ==
A short seller typically borrows through a broker, who is usually holding the securities for another investor who owns the securities; the broker himself seldom purchases the securities to lend to the short seller. The lender does not lose the right to sell the securities while they have been lent, as the broker usually holds a large pool of such securities for a number of investors which, as such securities are fungible, can instead be transferred to any buyer. In most market conditions there is a ready supply of securities to be borrowed, held by pension funds, mutual funds and other investors.

=== Shorting stock in the U.S. ===
To sell stocks short in the U.S., the seller must arrange for a broker-dealer to confirm that it can deliver the shorted securities. This is referred to as a locate. Brokers have a variety of means to borrow stocks to facilitate locates and make good on delivery of the shorted security.

The vast majority of stocks borrowed by U.S. brokers come from loans made by the leading custody banks and fund management companies (see list below). Institutions often lend out their shares to earn extra money on their investments. These institutional loans are usually arranged by the custodian who holds the securities for the institution. In an institutional stock loan, the borrower puts up cash collateral, typically 102% of the value of the stock. The cash collateral is then invested by the lender, who often rebates part of the interest to the borrower. The interest that is kept by the lender is the compensation to the lender for the stock loan.

Brokerage firms can also borrow stocks from the accounts of their own customers. Typical margin account agreements give brokerage firms the right to borrow customer shares without notifying the customer. In general, brokerage accounts are only allowed to lend shares from accounts for which customers have debit balances, meaning they have borrowed from the account. SEC Rule 15c3-3 imposes such severe restrictions on the lending of shares from cash accounts or excess margin (fully paid for) shares from margin accounts that most brokerage firms do not bother except in rare circumstances. (These restrictions include that the broker must have the express permission of the customer and provide collateral or a letter of credit.)

Most brokers allow retail customers to borrow shares to short a stock only if one of their own customers has purchased the stock on margin. Brokers go through the "locate" process outside their own firm to obtain borrowed shares from other brokers only for their large institutional customers.

Stock exchanges such as the NYSE or the NASDAQ typically report the "short interest" of a stock, which gives the number of shares that have been legally sold short as a percent of the total float. Alternatively, these can also be expressed as the short interest ratio, which is the number of shares legally sold short as a multiple of the average daily volume. These can be useful tools to spot trends in stock price movements but for them to be reliable, investors must also ascertain the number of shares brought into existence by naked shorters. Speculators are cautioned to remember that for every share that has been shorted (owned by a new owner), a 'shadow owner' exists (i.e., the original owner) who also is part of the universe of owners of that stock, i.e., despite having no voting rights, they have not relinquished their interest and some rights in that stock.

=== Securities lending ===
When a security is sold, the seller is contractually obliged to deliver it to the buyer. If a seller sells a security short without owning it first, the seller must borrow the security from a third party to fulfill its obligation. Otherwise, the seller fails to deliver, the transaction does not settle, and the seller may be subject to a claim from its counterparty. Certain large holders of securities, such as a custodian or investment management firm, often lend out these securities to gain extra income, a process known as securities lending. The lender receives a fee for this service. Similarly, retail investors can sometimes make an extra fee when their broker wants to borrow their securities. This is only possible when the investor has full title of the security, so it cannot be used as collateral for margin buying.

=== Sources of short interest data ===
Time delayed short interest data (for legally shorted shares) is available in a number of countries, including the US, the UK, Hong Kong, and Spain. The number of stocks being shorted on a global basis has increased in recent years for various structural reasons (e.g., the growth of 130/30 type strategies, short or bear ETFs). The data is typically delayed; for example, the NASDAQ requires its broker-dealer member firms to report data on the 15th of each month, and then publishes a compilation eight days later.

Some market data providers (like Data Explorers and SunGard Financial Systems) believe that stock lending data provides a good proxy for short interest levels (excluding any naked short interest). SunGard provides daily data on short interest by tracking the proxy variables based on borrowing and lending data it collects.

=== Short selling terms ===
Days to Cover (DTC) is the relationship between the number of shares in a given equity that has been legally short-sold and the number of days of typical trading that it would require to 'cover' all legal short positions outstanding. For example, if there are ten million shares of XYZ Inc. that are currently legally short-sold and the average daily volume of XYZ shares traded each day is one million, it would require ten days of average trading for all legal short positions to be covered (10 million / 1 million).

Short Interest relates the number of shares in a given equity that have been legally shorted divided by the total shares outstanding for the company, usually expressed as a percent. For example, if there are ten million shares of XYZ Inc. that are currently legally short-sold, and the total number of shares issued by the company is one hundred million, the Short Interest is 10% (10 million / 100 million). If, however, shares are being created through naked short selling, "fails" data must be accessed to assess accurately the true level of short interest.

Borrow cost is the fee paid to a securities lender for borrowing the stock or other security. The cost of borrowing the stock is usually negligible compared to fees paid and interest accrued on the margin account – in 2002, 91% of stocks could be shorted for less than a 1% fee per annum, generally lower than interest rates earned on the margin account. However, certain stocks become "hard to borrow" as stockholders willing to lend their stock become more difficult to locate. The cost of borrowing these stocks can become significant – in February 2001, the cost to borrow (short) Krispy Kreme stock reached an annualized 55%, indicating that a short seller would need to pay the lender more than half the price of the stock over the course of the year, essentially as interest for borrowing a stock in limited supply. This has important implications for derivatives pricing and strategy, for the borrow cost itself can become a significant convenience yield for holding the stock (similar to additional dividend) – for instance, put–call parity relationships are broken and the early exercise feature of American call options on non-dividend paying stocks can become rational to exercise early, which otherwise would not be economical.

==== Major lenders ====
- State Street Corporation (Boston, United States)
- Merrill Lynch (New Jersey, United States)
- JP Morgan Chase (New York, United States)
- Northern Trust (Chicago, United States)
- Fortis (Amsterdam, Netherlands, now defunct)
- ABN AMRO (Amsterdam, Netherlands, formerly Fortis)
- Citibank (New York, United States)
- Bank of New York Mellon Corporation (New York, United States)
- UBS AG (Zurich, Switzerland)
- Barclays (London, United Kingdom)

=== Naked short selling ===
A naked short sale occurs when a security is sold short without borrowing the security within a set time (for example, three days in the US.) This means that the buyer of such a short is buying the short-seller's promise to deliver a share, rather than buying the share itself. The short-seller's promise is known as a hypothecated share.

When the holder of the underlying stock receives a dividend, the holder of the hypothecated share would receive an equal dividend from the short seller.

Naked shorting has been made illegal except where allowed under limited circumstances by market makers. It is detected by the Depository Trust & Clearing Corporation (in the US) as a "failure to deliver" or simply "fail." While many fails are settled in a short time, some have been allowed to linger in the system.

In the US, arranging to borrow a security before a short sale is called a locate. In 2005, to prevent widespread failure to deliver securities, the U.S. Securities and Exchange Commission (SEC) put in place Regulation SHO, intended to prevent speculators from selling some stocks short before doing a locate. More stringent rules were put in place in September 2008, ostensibly to prevent the practice from exacerbating market declines. These rules were made permanent in 2009.

== Fees ==
When a broker facilitates the delivery of a client's short sale, the client is charged a fee for this service, usually a standard commission similar to that of purchasing a similar security.

If the short position begins to move against the holder of the short position (i.e., the price of the security begins to rise), money is removed from the holder's cash balance and moved to their margin balance. If short shares continue to rise in price, and the holder does not have sufficient funds in the cash account to cover the position, the holder begins to borrow on margin for this purpose, thereby accruing margin interest charges. These are computed and charged just as for any other margin debit. Therefore, only margin accounts can be used to open a short position.

When a security's ex-dividend date passes, the dividend is deducted from the shortholder's account and paid to the person from whom the stock is borrowed.

For some brokers, the short seller may not earn interest on the proceeds of the short sale or use it to reduce outstanding margin debt. These brokers may not pass this benefit on to the retail client unless the client is very large. The interest is often split with the lender of the security.

== Dividends and voting rights ==
Where shares have been shorted and the company that issues the shares distributes a dividend, the question arises as to who receives the dividend. The new buyer of the shares, who is the holder of record and holds the shares outright, receives the dividend from the company. However, the lender, who may hold its shares in a margin account with a prime broker and is unlikely to be aware that these particular shares are being lent out for shorting, also expects to receive a dividend. The short seller therefore pays the lender an amount equal to the dividend to compensate—though technically, as this payment does not come from the company, it is not a dividend. The short seller is therefore said to be short the dividend.

A similar issue comes up with the voting rights attached to the shorted shares. Unlike a dividend, voting rights cannot legally be synthesized and so the buyer of the shorted share, as the holder of record, controls the voting rights. The owner of a margin account from which the shares were lent agreed in advance to relinquish voting rights to shares during the period of any short sale.

As noted earlier, victims of naked shorting sometimes report that the number of votes cast is greater than the number of shares issued by the company.

== Markets ==
Transactions in financial derivatives such as options and futures have the same name but have different overlaps, one notable overlap is having an equal "negative" amount in the position. However, the practice of a short position in derivatives is completely different. Derivatives are contracts between two parties, a buyer and seller. Each trade results in a "long" (buyer's position) and a "short" (seller's position).

=== Futures and options contracts ===
When trading futures contracts, being 'short' means having the legal obligation to deliver something at the expiration of the contract, although the holder of the short position may alternately buy back the contract prior to expiration instead of making delivery. Short futures transactions are often used by producers of a commodity to fix the future price of goods they have not yet produced. Shorting a futures contract is sometimes also used by those holding the underlying asset (i.e. those with a long position) as a temporary hedge against price declines. Shorting futures may also be used for speculative trades, in which case the investor is looking to profit from any decline in the price of the futures contract prior to expiration.

An investor can also purchase a put option, giving that investor the right (but not the obligation) to sell the underlying asset (such as shares of stock) at a fixed price which the strategy is known as long put. In the event of a market decline, the option holder may exercise these put options, obliging the counterparty to buy the underlying asset at the agreed upon (or "strike") price, which would then be higher than the current quoted spot price of the asset.

=== Currency ===
Selling short on the currency markets is different from selling short on the stock markets. Currencies are traded in pairs, each currency being priced in terms of another. In this way, selling short on the currency markets is identical to going long on stocks.

Novice traders or stock traders can be confused by the failure to recognize and understand this point: a contract is always long in terms of one medium and short another.

When the exchange rate has changed, the trader buys the first currency again; this time they get more of it, and pay back the loan. Since they got more money than they had borrowed initially, they make money. The reverse can also occur.

An example of this is as follows: Let us say a trader wants to trade with the US dollar and the Indian rupee currencies. Assume that the current market rate is US$1 to Rs. 50 and the trader borrows Rs. 100. With this, they buy US$2. If the next day, the conversion rate becomes US$1 to Rs. 51, then the trader sells their US$2 and gets Rs. 102. They return Rs. 100 and keep the Rs. 2 profit (minus fees).

One may also take a short position in a currency using futures or options; the preceding method is used to bet on the spot price, which is more directly analogous to selling a stock short.

== Risks ==
Note: this section does not apply to currency markets.

Short selling is sometimes referred to as a "negative income investment strategy" because there is no potential for dividend income or interest income. Stock is held long enough to be sold pursuant to the contract, and one's return is therefore limited to short term capital gains, which are taxed as ordinary income. For this reason, buying shares (called "going long") has a very different risk profile from selling short. Furthermore, a "long's" losses are limited because the price can only go down to zero, but gains are not, as there is no limit, in theory, on how high the price can go. On the other hand, the short seller's possible gains are limited to the original price of the stock, which can only go down to zero, whereas the loss potential, again in theory, has no limit. For this reason, short selling probably is most often used as a hedge strategy to manage the risks of long investments.

Many short sellers place a stop order with their stockbroker after selling a stock short—an order to the brokerage to cover the position if the price of the stock should rise to a certain level. This is to limit the loss and avoid the problem of unlimited liability described above. In some cases, if the stock's price skyrockets, the stockbroker may decide to cover the short seller's position immediately and without their consent to guarantee that the short seller can make good on their debt of shares.

Short sellers must be aware of the potential for a short squeeze. When the price of a stock rises significantly, some people who are shorting the stock cover their positions to limit their losses (this may occur in an automated way if the short sellers had stop-loss orders in place with their brokers); others may be forced to close their position to meet a margin call; others may be forced to cover, subject to the terms under which they borrowed the stock, if the person who lent the stock wishes to sell and take a profit. Since covering their positions involves buying shares, the short squeeze causes an ever further rise in the stock's price, which in turn may trigger additional covering. Because of this, most short sellers restrict their activities to heavily traded stocks, and they keep an eye on the "short interest" levels of their short investments. Short interest is defined as the total number of shares that have been legally sold short, but not covered. A short squeeze can be deliberately induced. This can happen when large investors (such as companies or wealthy individuals) notice significant short positions, and buy many shares, with the intent of selling the position at a profit to the short sellers, who may be panicked by the initial uptick or who are forced to cover their short positions to avoid margin calls.

Another risk is that a given stock may become "hard to borrow". As defined by the SEC and based on lack of availability, a broker may charge a hard to borrow fee daily, without notice, for any day that the SEC declares a share is hard to borrow. Additionally, a broker may be required to cover a short seller's position at any time ("buy in"). The short seller receives a warning from the broker that they are "failing to deliver" stock, which leads to the buy-in.

Because short sellers must eventually deliver the shorted securities to their broker, and need money to buy them, there is a credit risk for the broker. The penalties for failure to deliver on a short selling contract inspired financier Daniel Drew to warn: "He who sells what isn't his'n, Must buy it back or go to pris'n." To manage its own risk, the broker requires the short seller to keep a margin account, and charges interest of between 2% and 8% depending on the amounts involved.

In 2011, the eruption of the massive China stock frauds on North American equity markets brought a related risk to light for the short seller. The efforts of research-oriented short sellers to expose these frauds eventually prompted NASDAQ, NYSE and other exchanges to impose sudden, lengthy trading halts that froze the values of shorted stocks at artificially high values. Reportedly in some instances, brokers charged short sellers excessively large amounts of interest based on these high values as the shorts were forced to continue their borrowings at least until the halts were lifted.

Short sellers tend to temper overvaluation by selling into exuberance. Likewise, short sellers are said to provide price support by buying when negative sentiment is exacerbated after a significant price decline. Short selling can have negative implications if it causes a premature or unjustified share price collapse when the fear of cancellation due to bankruptcy becomes contagious.

== Strategies ==
=== Hedging ===
Hedging often represents a means of minimizing the risk from a more complex set of transactions. Examples of this are:

- A farmer who has just planted their wheat wants to lock in the price at which they can sell after the harvest. The farmer would take a short position in wheat futures.
- A market maker in corporate bonds is constantly trading bonds when clients want to buy or sell. This can create substantial bond positions. The largest risk is that interest rates overall move. The trader can hedge this risk by selling government bonds short against their long positions in corporate bonds. In this way, the risk that remains is credit risk of the corporate bonds.
- An options trader may short shares to remain delta neutral so that they are not exposed to risk from price movements in the stocks that underlie their options.

=== Arbitrage ===
A short seller may be trying to benefit from market inefficiencies arising from the mispricing of certain products. Examples of this are

- An arbitrageur who buys long futures contracts on a US Treasury security, and sells short the underlying US Treasury security.

=== Against the box ===
One variant of selling short involves a long position. "Selling short against the box" consists of holding a long position on which the shares have already risen, whereupon one then enters a short sell order for an equal number of shares. The term box alludes to the days when a safe deposit box was used to store (long) shares. The purpose of this technique is to lock in paper profits on the long position without having to sell that position (and possibly incur taxes if said position has appreciated). Once the short position has been entered, it serves to balance the long position taken earlier. Thus, from that point in time, the profit is locked in (less brokerage fees and short financing costs), regardless of further fluctuations in the underlying share price. For example, one can ensure a profit in this way, while delaying sale until the subsequent tax year.

U.S. investors considering entering into a "short against the box" transaction should be aware of the tax consequences of this transaction. Unless certain conditions are met, the IRS deems a "short against the box" position to be a "constructive sale" of the long position, which is a taxable event. These conditions include a requirement that the short position be closed out within 30 days of the end of the year and that the investor must hold their long position, without entering into any hedging strategies, for a minimum of 60 days after the short position has been closed.

== Regulations ==
=== United States ===
The Securities Exchange Act of 1934 gave the Securities and Exchange Commission the power to regulate short sales. The first official restriction on short selling came in 1938, when the SEC adopted a rule (known as the uptick rule) that a short sale could only be made when the price of a particular stock was higher than the previous trade price. The uptick rule aimed to prevent short sales from causing or exacerbating market price declines. The rule remained in force until the SEC repealed it with effect from July 2007.

In January 2005, The Securities and Exchange Commission enacted Regulation SHO to target abusive naked short selling. Regulation SHO was the SEC's first update to short selling restrictions since the uptick rule in 1938.

The regulation contains two key components: the "locate" and the "close-out". The locate component attempts to reduce failure to deliver securities by requiring a broker possess or have arranged to possess borrowed shares. The close out component requires that a broker be able to deliver the shares that are to be shorted. In the US, initial public offers (IPOs) cannot be sold short for a month after they start trading. This mechanism is in place to ensure a degree of price stability during a company's initial trading period. However, some brokerage firms that specialize in penny stocks (referred to colloquially as bucket shops) have used the lack of short selling during this month to pump and dump thinly traded IPOs. Canada and other countries do allow selling IPOs (including U.S. IPOs) short.

The Securities and Exchange Commission initiated a temporary ban on short selling of 799 financial stocks from 19 September 2008 until 2 October 2008. Greater penalties for naked shorting, by mandating delivery of stocks at clearing time, were also introduced. Some state governors have been urging state pension bodies to refrain from lending stock for shorting purposes. An assessment of the effect of the temporary ban on short-selling in the United States and other countries during the 2008 financial crisis showed that it had only "little impact" on the movements of stocks, with stock prices moving in the same way as they would have moved anyhow, but the ban reduced volume and liquidity.

With the uptick rule no longer in force, the SEC adopted a replacement price test in February 2010. Rule 201 of Regulation SHO operates as a circuit breaker rather than a continuous restriction: once the listing market determines that a covered security has fallen 10% or more below the previous day's closing price, trading centers must stop short sale orders from being displayed or filled unless priced above the prevailing best bid. The restriction runs for the remainder of that day and the following trading day.

Disclosure of short positions has been addressed more recently. Rule 13f-2, adopted in 2023, would require institutional investment managers whose monthly average gross short position reaches $10 million or 2.5% of a company's shares to file monthly reports with the SEC for publication in aggregate form. The Fifth Circuit remanded the rule to the Commission in August 2025, and compliance has since been deferred to 2028.

=== Europe ===
In the UK, the Financial Services Authority had a moratorium on short selling of 29 leading financial stocks, effective from 2300 GMT on 19 September 2008 until 16 January 2009. After the ban was lifted, John McFall, chairman of the Treasury Select Committee, House of Commons, made clear in public statements and a letter to the FSA that he believed it ought to be extended.

Also in September 2008, Germany, Ireland and Switzerland banned short selling of leading financial stocks, and France, the Netherlands and Belgium banned naked short selling of leading financial stocks.

These national measures were uncoordinated, and the European Union subsequently adopted a harmonised framework. Under the Short Selling Regulation, which has applied since 2012, a seller of shares or sovereign debt must have borrowed the instrument or made equivalent arrangements to deliver it before selling, and may hold a sovereign credit default swap position only as a hedge against a corresponding exposure. Net short positions in shares are notified privately to the national regulator once they reach 0.1% of issued share capital, and published once they reach 0.5%. The regulation also gives national authorities, and in exceptional circumstances the European Securities and Markets Authority, power to impose temporary restrictions; these powers were used by several member states in 2020.

The United Kingdom kept this framework after leaving the EU but later replaced it. The Short Selling Regulations 2025, made in January 2025, established a new statutory framework and handed detailed rule-making to the Financial Conduct Authority; the FCA's rules took effect on 13 July 2026. The UK regime requires notification at 0.2% rather than 0.1% and no longer identifies individual position holders publicly, the FCA instead publishing aggregate figures by company. UK sovereign debt and the associated credit default swaps fall outside the reporting and covering requirements, though the regulator's emergency powers still reach them.

=== Canada ===
Canada banned short selling of leading financial stocks in September 2008. Unlike the United States, Canada does not impose a locate requirement. Instead, a participant must have a reasonable expectation of settling on the settlement date before entering an order that would result in a short sale, a requirement added to the Universal Market Integrity Rules in 2025; pre-borrowing is required only for securities specifically designated by the regulator.

=== Asia-Pacific ===
Australia banned short selling on 21 September 2008 due to market volatility. The Australian Securities and Investments Commission (ASIC) lifted the ban on short selling of non-financial stocks on 19 November 2008, then lifted the ban on short selling of financial stocks on 25 May 2009. The prohibition on naked short selling was retained: under the Corporations Act 2001 a seller must have a presently exercisable and unconditional right to deliver the securities, so short sales must be covered by a securities lending arrangement. Position holders report to the ASIC daily, and ASIC publishes aggregate figures after a delay rather than naming individual holders.

Japan prohibits naked short selling, requires all sell orders to explicitly confirm whether it is a short sale or not, and requires short-sellers to report their net short positions to the exchange at 0.2% of a company's issued shares, with public disclosure at 0.5%. A security will be subjected to the uptick rule for the remainder of the trading day, and in some cases the following day, once it has fallen 10% or more below the previous day's close. The Japan Exchange Group publishes the daily aggregate value of all short selling transactions on every trading day.

Hong Kong prohibits naked short selling, requires all short sales to observe the uptick rule, and only securities designated by the Stock Exchange of Hong Kong (SEHK) as eligible for short selling can be sold short. The SEHK publishes the daily short selling turnover figures for all designated securities on every trading day. Net short positions are reported weekly to the Securities and Futures Commission (SFC) once they exceed HK$30 million or 0.02% of the issuer's market capitalisation (whichever is lower), and the SFC publishes the figures in aggregate.

Chinese regulators responded to the 2008 crisis by permitting short selling rather than restricting it, as part of a broader package of market reforms. A pilot programme began in October 2008, and the Shanghai and Shenzhen Stock Exchanges started accepting short sale declarations on 31 March 2010, initially for a restricted list of large companies with strong earnings and low price volatility. Borrowing stock was restricted after the market crash of 2015, and from 2023 the China Securities Regulatory Commission introduced a further series of curbs, blaming short selling for market weakness. By July 2024 it had suspended securities re-lending altogether and raised the margin ratios short sellers must post, reducing the stock available to borrow rather than prohibiting short selling itself.

== Views of short selling ==
Advocates of short selling argue that the practice is an essential part of the price discovery mechanism. Financial researchers at Duke University said in a study that short interest is an indicator of poor future stock performance (the self-fulfilling aspect) and that short sellers exploit market mistakes about firms' fundamentals.

Such noted investors as Seth Klarman and Warren Buffett have said that short sellers help the market. Klarman argued that short sellers are a useful counterweight to the widespread bullishness on Wall Street, while Buffett believes that short sellers are useful in uncovering fraudulent accounting and other problems at companies.

Short-seller James Chanos received widespread publicity when he was an early critic of the accounting practices of Enron. Chanos responded to critics of short-selling by pointing to the critical role they played in identifying problems at Enron, Boston Market and other "financial disasters" over the years. In 2011, research-oriented short sellers were widely acknowledged for exposing the China stock frauds.

Short selling and hedge fund advocate Bryan Corbett, CEO of Managed Funds Association argued that over-regulation of short selling could expose investors' strategies, which could harm market investors, market participants, and market efficiency.

Commentator Jim Cramer has expressed concern about short selling and started a petition calling for the reintroduction of the uptick rule. Books like Don't Blame the Shorts by Robert Sloan and Fubarnomics by Robert E. Wright suggest Cramer exaggerated the costs of short selling and underestimated the benefits, which may include the ex ante identification of asset bubbles.

Individual short sellers have been subject to criticism and even litigation. Manuel P. Asensio, for example, engaged in a lengthy legal battle with the pharmaceutical manufacturer Hemispherx Biopharma.

Several studies of the effectiveness of short selling bans indicate that short selling bans do not contribute to more moderate market dynamics.

== See also ==
- Anthony Elgindy
- The Big Short
- Inverse exchange-traded fund
- James Chanos
- Joseph Parnes
- Magnetar Capital
- Manuel P. Asensio
- Margin
- Repurchase agreement
- Sharia and securities trading
- Short squeeze
- Socially responsible investing
- Special settlement (securities)
- Straddle

== General and cited references ==
- Fleckner, Andreas M. "Regulating Trading Practices" in The Oxford Handbook of Financial Regulation (Oxford: Oxford University Press, 2015). ISBN 978-0-19-968720-6.
- Sloan, Robert. Don't Blame the Shorts: Why Short Sellers Are Always Blamed for Market Crashes and Why History Is Repeating Itself (New York: McGraw-Hill Professional, 2009). ISBN 978-0-07-163686-5.
- Wright, Robert E. Fubarnomics: A Lighthearted, Serious Look at America's Economic Ills (Buffalo, N.Y.: Prometheus, 2010). ISBN 978-1-61614-191-2.
