= Stock loan quasi-mortgage =

Type of securities lending

A Stock loan quasi-mortgage is a form of securities lending that uses stocks, bonds, mutual funds, or other eligible securities as the effective guarantee for a personal credit line used for the purchase of a home, investment in real estate, or for some portion of either of these (e.g., short-term finance, down payments). Stock loan quasi-mortgages are typically in the form of a simple credit line, with interest-only repayment terms.

Although margin-loan financing is the most well-known form of individual finance in the field of securities lending, the stock loan quasi-mortgage is substantially different. These loans are crafted as non-purpose credit in compliance with FRB Banking regulations, as opposed to margin loans which are "purpose credit". The key difference is that margin loan financing is intended for the purchase of stock, allowing the client to leverage the value of their holdings, while "non-purpose credit" is for any application other than the repurchase of marginable securities. Interest, however, may be deductible.

The stock loan quasi-mortgage is not a mortgage in the purest sense, but rather an asset-based formed of financing that allows borrowers to tap their portfolios without having to liquidate them. Unlike "non-recourse stock loans" which have been dismantled and regulated out of existence by lawmakers in the post-financial crisis era, the stock loan quasi-mortgage programs of today are handled entirely by and through fully licensed and regulated brokerages that are members of the Financial Industry Regulatory Authority (FINRA) and banks with transparent and audited financials.

== Availability ==
These institutional credit line programs are available only through long-standing depository relationships with institutional brokerages and their banking arms, and typically come with large depository minimums. However, there are a few securities-based credit line programs currently open to the general public that allow access at competitive rates and terms without such advance depository or client relationships, and these can be easily found by searching on no title transfer stock loan financing and similar terms.

== Risks ==
Stock loan quasi-mortgages are callable if the value of the portfolio drops below a prescribed point, typically 130% of the value of whatever has been drawn. Unlike margin loans, however, most securities-based credit lines – of which a stock loan quasi-mortgage is an example – allow liberal call cure periods and multiple means to resolve the collateral issue, including the restructuring of some portfolio into less volatile securities. The best programs typically have a very good call record, with few or none, making the risk of a call relatively negligible.

== Applications ==
A stock-loan quasi-mortgage can be used to purchase a residential or commercial property outright, and can mean greatly reduced payments over time. Since most are structured as revolving lines of credit, they have no term, allowing the client to repay the principal (and refill their line) at their own pace. Rates are typically less than mortgages too, since this is a pure asset-based loan and the goal of the lending institution is not interest on your loan, but keeping a depository relationship with you long-term. Stock loan quasi-mortgages are used to bridge funding for short terms: sincere there is not a set term, and the principal can be repaid at any time, real estate investors who are waiting for other funding to be cleared but need to lock in a purchase can do so with their stock loan quasi-mortgage credit line, then repay the line and employ the regular loan as planned when the latter is ready. Since most of these securities-type credit lines close very quickly (two weeks or fewer on average) they can be the perfect solution, and do not require the sale of stock that might trigger a taxable event.

Stock loan quasi-mortgages are sometimes used as "insurance" cash for those real estate investors who want to be able to pull out a check book on the spot and lock in a purchase at known rates and terms, without running into unreasonable bank limits or requirements.
