= Uptick rule =

Trading restriction

The uptick rule is a trading restriction that states that short selling a stock is allowed only on an uptick. For the rule to be satisfied, the short must be either at a price above the last traded price of the security, or at the last traded price when the most recent movement between traded prices was upward (i.e. the security has traded below the last-traded price more recently than above that price).

The U.S. Securities and Exchange Commission (SEC) defined the rule, and summarized it: "Rule 10a-1(a)(1) provided that, subject to certain exceptions, a listed security may be sold short (A) at a price above the price at which the immediately preceding sale was effected (plus tick), or (B) at the last sale price if it is higher than the last different price (zero-plus tick). Short sales were not permitted on minus ticks or zero-minus ticks, subject to narrow exceptions."

The rule went into effect in 1938 and was removed when Rule 201 Regulation SHO became effective in 2007. In 2009, the reintroduction of the uptick rule was widely debated, and proposals for a form of its reintroduction by the SEC went into a public comment period on April 8, 2009. A modified form of the rule, known as a short-sale restriction, was adopted on February 24, 2010.

== United States ==
=== Origin ===
In 1938, the U.S. Securities and Exchange Commission (SEC) adopted the uptick rule, more formally known as rule 10a-1, after conducting an inquiry into the effects of concentrated short selling during the market break of 1937. The original rule was implemented when Joseph P. Kennedy Sr. was SEC commissioner.

In 1994, the NASD and Nasdaq adopted their own short sale price tests, known as NASD Rule 3350, based on the last bid rather than on the last reported sale.

In 1978, the purpose of the uptick rule was described in a standard text "It was not unusual [prior to 1934] to discover groups of speculators pooling their capital and selling short for the sole purpose of driving down the stock price of a particular security to a level where the stockholders would panic and unload their fully owned shares. This, in turn, caused even greater declines in value."

== SEC actions commencing in 2004 leading to the end of the uptick rule ==
"In 2004, the Commission initiated a year-long pilot that eliminated short sale price test restrictions from approximately one-third of the largest stocks. The purpose of the pilot was to study how the removal of such short sale price test restrictions impacted the market for those subject securities.

Short sale data was made publicly available during this pilot to allow the public and Commission staff to study the effects of eliminating short sale price test restrictions. Third-party researchers analyzed the publicly available data and presented their findings in a public Roundtable discussion in September 2006. The Commission staff also studied the pilot data extensively and made its findings available in draft form in September 2006, and final form in February 2007.

At the time the SEC acted in 2007, two different types of price tests covered significant numbers of securities. The Nasdaq "bid" test, based on the national best bid, covered approximately 2,900 Nasdaq securities in 2005 (or 44 million short sales). The SEC's former uptick test (former Rule 10a-1), based on the last sale price, covered approximately 4,000 exchange-listed securities (or 68 million short sales)."

== Elimination of the uptick rule ==
Effective July 3, 2007, the Commission, under Chairman Christopher Cox, eliminated former Rule 10a-1 and added Rule 201 of Regulation SHO, prohibiting any SRO from having a short sale price test. The SEC concluded from the study cited above: "The general consensus from these analyses and the roundtable was that the Commission should remove price test restrictions because they modestly reduce liquidity and do not appear necessary to prevent manipulation. In addition, the empirical evidence did not provide strong support for extending a price test to either small or thinly-traded securities not currently subject to a price test."

In addition, the Commission stated its belief that the amendments would bring increased uniformity to short sale regulation, level the playing field for market participants, and remove an opportunity for regulatory arbitrage.

Commenting on the scrapping of the uptick rule, The Economist reported that "short-sellers argue [it] was largely symbolic, and it remains in place at only a few of the world's big stock exchanges."

=== Calls for reinstatement ===
On August 27, 2007, the New York Times published an article on Muriel Siebert, former state banking superintendent of New York, "Wall Street veteran and financial sage", and, in 1967, the first woman to become a member of the New York Stock Exchange. In this article she expressed severe concerns about market volatility: "We've never seen volatility like this. We're watching history being made." Siebert pointed to the uptick rule, saying, "The S.E.C. took away the short-sale rule and when the markets were falling, institutional investors just pounded stocks because they didn't need an uptick."

On March 28, 2008 Jim Cramer of CNBC offered the opinion that the absence of the uptick rule harms the stock market today. He claimed that reintroducing the uptick rule would help stabilize the banking sector.

On July 3, 2008 Wachtell, Lipton, Rosen & Katz, an adviser on mergers and acquisitions, said short-selling was at record levels and asked the SEC to take urgent action and reinstate the 70-year-old uptick rule. On November 20, 2008, they renewed their call stating "Decisive action cannot await ... a new S.E.C. Chairman. ... There is no tomorrow. The failure to reinstate the Uptick Rule is not acceptable."

On July 16, 2008, Congressman Gary Ackerman (D-NY), Congresswoman Carolyn Maloney (D-NY) and Congressman Mike Capuano (D-MA) introduced H.R. 6517, "A bill to require the Securities and Exchange Commission to reinstate the uptick rule on short sales of securities."

On September 18, 2008, presidential candidate and Senator John McCain (R-AZ) said that the SEC allowed short-selling to turn "our markets into a casino." McCain criticized the SEC and its chairman for eliminating the uptick rule.

On October 6, 2008, Erik Sirri, director of the Securities and Exchange Commission's Division of Trading and Markets, said that the SEC is considering bringing back the uptick rule, stating, "It's something we have talked about and it may be something that we in fact do."

On October 17, 2008, the New York Stock Exchange reported a survey with 85% of its members being in favor of reinstating the uptick rule with the dominant reason to "help instill market confidence".

On November 18, 2008, The Wall Street Journal published an opinion editorial by Robert Pozen and Yaneer Bar-Yam describing an analysis of the difference between regulated and unregulated stocks during the SEC pilot program. By using an analysis they claimed to be more comprehensive than the SEC's original study, they showed that unregulated stocks have lower returns, with a difference that is both statistically and economically significant. They also reported that twice as many stocks had greater than 40% drops in corresponding 12 month periods before and after the repeal.

On January 20, 2009, Ackerman received a letter from Chairman Cox—written the day he left the SEC—in which Cox said he supports the reinstatement of an uptick rule. The letter reads, "I have been interested in proposing an updated uptick rule. However, as you know, the SEC is a commission of five members. Throughout 2008 there was not a majority interested in reconsidering the 2007 decision to repeal the uptick rule, or in proposing some modernized variant of it. I sincerely hope that the commission, in the year ahead, continues to reassess this issue in light of the extraordinary market events of the last several months, with a view to implementing a modernized version of the uptick rule."

On February 25, 2009, Chairman of the Federal Reserve, Ben Bernanke in testimony before the House Financial Services Committee stated he favored the SEC examining restoring the uptick-rule.

On March 10, 2009, the SEC and Congressman Barney Frank (D-MA), Chairman of the Financial Services Committee announced plans to restore the uptick rule. Frank said he was hopeful that it would be restored within a month.

== 2008 Financial Crisis ==
A paper from the New England Complex Systems Institute claims that they have found evidence that suggests the 2008 financial crisis was triggered by a "Bear Raid" market manipulation by short sellers against Citigroup late in 2007. The uptick rule was repealed in July, 2007, and the alleged bear raid took place in November, 2007.

This paper has an addendum based on additional data provided by the NYSE for short sells during the time period that in fact the uptick rule would not have prevented what occurred. To quote the paper directly:

The new information we received implies that the sale of borrowed shares reflected in the increase in borrowed shares on November 1 and the corresponding decrease on November 7 may have been done in a way that would not have been prevented by the uptick rule. A more detailed inquiry into the means by which such selling could have been done is beyond the current work.

== Proposals for restoration of the uptick rule ==
On April 8, 2009, the SEC voted to seek public comment on the following proposals to restore a form of the uptick rule.

The SEC disclosed the 273 page text of the proposals on April 17, 2009. The comment period closed on June 19, 2009.

Market-Wide, Permanent Approach:

- Proposed Modified Uptick Rule: A market-wide short sale price test based on the national best bid (a proposed modified uptick rule).
- Proposed Uptick Rule: A market-wide short sale price test based on the last sale price or tick (a proposed uptick rule).

Security-Specific, Temporary Approach:

- Circuit Breaker: A circuit breaker that would either:
  - Ban short selling in a particular security for the remainder of the day if there is a severe decline in price in that security (a proposed circuit breaker halt rule).
  - Impose a short sale price test based on the national best bid in a particular security for the remainder of the day if there is a severe decline in price in that security (a proposed circuit breaker modified uptick rule).
  - Impose a short sale price test based on the last sale price in a particular security for the remainder of the day if there is a severe decline in price in that security (a proposed circuit breaker uptick rule).

== Adoption of Alternative Uptick Rule ==
On February 24, 2010, the SEC adopted the alternative uptick rule, by amending Rules 200(g) and 201 of Regulation SHO [17 CFR 242.200(g) and 17 CFR 242.201] under the Exchange Act. The new rule does not apply to all securities. It is triggered when a security's price decreases by 10% or more from the previous day's closing price and is effective until the close of the next day.

Specifically Rule 201(b) has the following amendments:

(b) (1) A trading center shall establish, maintain, and enforce written policies and procedures reasonably designed to:

(i) Prevent the execution or display of a short sale order of a covered security at a price that is less than or equal to the current national best bid if the price of that covered security decreases by 10% or more from the covered security's closing price as determined by the listing market for the covered security as of the end of regular trading hours on the prior day; and

(ii) Impose the requirements of paragraph (b)(1)(i) of this section for the remainder of the day and the following day when a national best bid for the covered security is calculated and disseminated on a current and continuing basis by a plan processor pursuant to an effective national market system plan.

(iii) Provided, however, that the policies and procedures must be reasonably designed to permit:

(A) The execution of a displayed short sale order of a covered security by a trading center if, at the time of initial display of the short sale order, the order was at a price above the current national best bid; and

(B) The execution or display of a short sale order of a covered security marked "short exempt" without regard to whether the order is at a price that is less than or equal to the current national best bid.

== Hong Kong ==
Hong Kong traditionally had no uptick rule, a situation depicted in James Clavell's novel Noble House. The Securities and Futures Commission instituted one following the 1997 Asian financial crisis.

As of 2026, the Hong Kong Stock Exchange required all short sales to observe the uptick rule, with limited exceptions.

== Effectiveness of the rule ==
Gordon J. Alexander and Mark A. Peterson, in an academic study of the uptick rule, found "the execution quality of short-sell orders is adversely affected by the Uptick Rule, even when stocks are trading in advancing markets. This is inconsistent with one of the three stated objectives of the rule, i.e., to allow relatively unrestricted short selling when a firm's stock is advancing so that the rule does not affect price discovery during such times."

Karl B. Diether, Kuan-Hui Lee, and Ingrid M. Werner stated in their study: "The results suggest that the effect of the price-tests on market quality can largely be attributed to the distortions in order flow created by the price-tests in the first place. Therefore, we believe that the price-tests can safely be permanently suspended."

One empirical study found no statistically significant link between the uptick rule and the rates of price decline.

A 2006 study by Alexander and Peterson found no substantial differences between stocks subjected to the rule and those that were not.

While the market experienced a brief upward trend when the rule first became effective in February 1938, it ultimately continued the broad decline that had begun in 1937—though the fact that the market suffers a short-term decline does not necessarily establish that the rule is ineffective in contributing to long-term market confidence.
