= Triparty required value =

A triparty required value (RQV) is the value of collateral required by a securities lending lender in exchange for the outstanding loans that they have made to their borrower. An RQV will be satisfied through a combination of collateral types, such as equities, government bonds, convertible bonds, cash, or other products. RQV collateral requirements can be very complicated, involving instrument attributes such as how heavily traded they are, their minimum price, specific indexes, redemption dates, and other fields.

== Vendors providing RQV services ==
- BNY Mellon
- Clearstream
- Euroclear
- JPMorgan Chase
- Pirum
- SIX Swiss Exchange
