= International Securities Lending Association =

Finance industry association

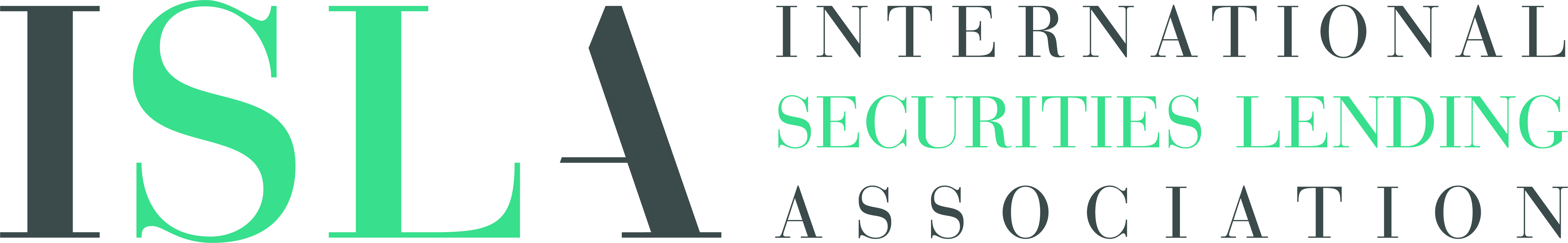
- Abbreviation: ISLA
- Formation: 1989; 37 years ago
- Type: Non-governmental industry association
- Purpose: Support the securities lending industry
- Location: London, United Kingdom
- Region served: Europe, the Middle East and Africa (EMEA)
- Services: Membership advocacy, standards and consultation
- Members: 220 firms (2026)
- Chief Executive Officer: Ina Budh Raja
- Website: www.islaemea.org

The International Securities Lending Association (ISLA) is an industry association representing the common interests of securities lending and financing market participants across Europe, Middle East and Africa (MENA). Its membership of over 220 firms includes institutional investors, asset managers, custodial banks, prime brokers and service providers.

The association works with the global industry as well as regulators and policy makers, ISLA advocates the importance of securities lending to the broader financial services industry. ISLA aims to support the development of a safe and efficient framework for the industry, by playing a role in promoting market best practices and processes. ISLA also sponsors the Global Market Securities Lending Agreement (GMSLA) and the annual enforceability review in over 71 jurisdictions globally.

== Securities lending ==
Securities Lending is a market where an investor temporarily lends securities to a borrower in return for a fee. At the end of the transaction the lender and the borrower return their respective securities/collateral to one another

According to the association, securities Lending can makes markets safer by reducing operational risk through settlement fails. It is also required for settlement when short selling.

== Market size ==
Until the start of 2009, securities lending was only an over-the-counter market, so the size of this industry was difficult to estimate accurately. According to the industry group ISLA, in the year 2007 the balance of securities on loan globally exceeded £1 trillion. In July 2015, the value was $1.72 trillion (with a total of $13.22 trillion available on loan) – similar to levels before the 2008 financial crisis.

The size of the global securities lending market, which includes equity and fixed income securities was recorded as Euro 2.4 Trillion at the end of December 2020.
