= Failure to deliver =

Inability of a party to deliver an asset as contractually required

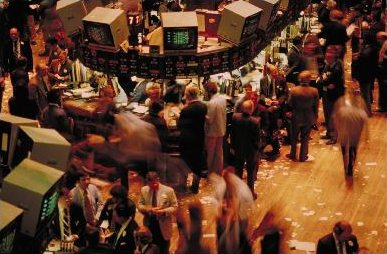
Traders on the floor of a stock exchange

In finance, a failure to deliver (also FTD, plural: fails-to-deliver or FTDs) is the inability of a party to deliver a tradable asset, or meet a contractual obligation. A typical example of a FTD is when a purchaser of a security does not have the cash, or shares as part of a short transaction. The Securities and Exchange Commission publishes FTD data regarding transactions in the United States.

As a remedy for this in the United States, Regulation SHO was designed. Stocks bought and sold in transaction must be settled within one business day. The buyer must deliver the cash and the seller the stock. If either party fails, a FTD takes place. Sometimes deliberate FTDs are used to profit from falling stocks (see Bear market), so that the stock can later be purchased at a lower price, then delivered, e.g. in the week of March 10, 2008, just before the failure of Bear Stearns, FTDs had increased by 10,800 percent.

According to CNN in the US markets, FTDs had reached $200 billion a day in September 2011, but no similar data has been available for Europe.

A study of FTDs, published in the Journal of Financial Economics in 2014, found no evidence that FTDs "caused price distortions or the failure of financial firms during the 2008 financial crisis." Researchers studied 1,492 New York Stock Exchange stocks over a 42-month period from 2005 to 2008, and found that "greater FTDs lead to higher liquidity and pricing efficiency, and their impact is similar to our estimate of delivered short sales."

A 2016 Journal of Empirical Finance study broader in scope than that by Fotak, et al., found that indeed pricing abnormalities of Russell 3000 stocks with high FTDs can be attributed to the market distorting effect of the sustained fails.
