= Credit Benchmark =

Credit Benchmark Limited
- Type: Privately held company
- Industry: Data analytics, financial technology
- Founded: 2012; 14 years ago
- Founder: Mark Faulkner, Donal Smith
- Headquarters: London, United Kingdom
- Number of locations: 2 offices (London and New York)
- Area served: Worldwide
- Key people: Donal Smith (Executive Chairman), Mark Faulkner, Michael Crumpler (CEO), Joshua Jian (COO)
- Website: creditbenchmark.com

Credit Benchmark, (CB) is a British financial data analytics company which provides credit consensus ratings and analytics based on the contributed risk views of major global financial institutions. The internal risk views of these institutions are collected, aggregated and anonymized to create a Credit Consensus Rating on tens of thousands of corporate, financial, fund and sovereign entities globally.

The company is headquartered in London, UK, with offices in New York City, and services a global client base of banks, insurance and reinsurance companies, asset managers, certified credit professional (CCPs) and other firms. Credit Benchmark has been releasing Credit Consensus data since May 2015.

== History ==
Credit Benchmark was founded in 2012 by Donal Smith and Mark Faulkner, both previously of Data Explorers. It completed a $7 million Series A funding round in 2014, led by Index Ventures; a $20 million Series B funding round in 2015, led by Balderton Capital; and a $7 million funding round in 2018 led by Index Ventures, Balderton Capital, Communitas Capital and a group of private investors including ex-Goldman Sachs International CEO, Michael Sherwood.

The company began collecting Probability of Default (PD) and forward-looking senior unsecured Loss Given Default (LGD) data from several Internal Ratings Based ("IRB") banks in 2014. The first Credit Consensus data release was in May 2015 and has continued on a monthly and subsequently a twice monthly basis since.

In 2019, Credit Benchmark announced the formation of an Advisory Board, chaired by ex-Goldman Sachs CRO, Craig Broderick. The data was also added to the FactSet Marketplace that year.

In 2020, Credit Benchmark supplied the Bank of England access to the CB dataset to help process COVID Corporate Financing Facility ("CCFF") applications. Later that year, partnerships were announced with the Global Peer Financing Association ("GPFA") and IHS Markit. Credit Benchmark's dataset was also launched on the Bloomberg Terminal and enterprise service in November 2020.

Credit Benchmark joined the World Economic Forum's Global Innovators Community in 2022.

== Products and Services ==
Credit Benchmark offers a subscription-based data service to a global client base of banks, insurance and reinsurance companies, asset managers, CCPs and other firms.

The dataset includes 80,000+ entity-level Credit Consensus Ratings and Analytics supplemented by descriptive analytics that provide insights into the underlying credit views that make up the Consensus including range and standard deviation.

Through a partnership with Bloomberg, Credit Benchmark also offers rating assessments (notching) for bonds and loans issued by the entities with Credit Consensus Ratings. This service combines the Credit Benchmark Consensus with Bloomberg's security reference dataset to create security-level rating assessments for approximately 130,000 bonds and loans amounting to $34+ trillion outstanding.
