= Manuel P. Asensio =

American businessman

- Born: December 30, 1954 (age 71); La Habana, Cuba
- Education: Wharton School of the University of Pennsylvania; Harvard Business School
- Occupations: Financial analysts, hedge fund manager, investor
- Known for: Founder, Asensio & Company
- Website: asensio.com

Manuel P. Asensio (born December 30, 1954, in La Habana, Cuba) is the founder, chairman and president of Asensio & Company, LLC an investment firm established in 1992.

Asensio is the recognized pioneer of activist short selling.

He is the author of a book about his short selling work entitled Sold Short: Uncovering the Markets.

== Career ==
While at Harvard, Asensio began proprietary trading, and established Boca Raton Investment Corp. as his own trading firm when he graduated in 1982. He went to work for Bear Stearns in 1986.

Asensio sold companies short he believed to be engaging in fraud, and was noted for publicizing his negative opinions. He made claims of fraud or misrepresentation involving 26 companies as of 2004. According to Asensio, of the 52 companies he publicly campaigned against, the average decline in value was around 86 percent, wiping out $30 billion in market value, from which he grossed millions in profits.

Prior to making a short sale, Asensio would look at statements made by the company, to determine if they are flawed, and if claims made by the company can be verified. Asensio said in a 2004 magazine interview that:

If there's a big variance between that and with what the company is saying, which we know is not right, it is reflected in the stock price that attracts us to a market.

If you do identify a security that's trading significantly above its fundamental value and if there are a set of representations made by a company which you find to be faulty, and that those representations impact the stock price, you will make money. If you have the sophistication to be able to trade, you will be able to make a substantial amount of money.

His short selling activities and public statements resulted in numerous lawsuits. Asensio claimed to have been sued for $1 billion in seven states as of 2004, and spent around $10 million defending himself, but had yet to lose a monetary judgment. One jury found him guilty of misrepresentation without ordering a judgment.

== Regulatory sanctions ==
In November 2000, the NASD (now FINRA) sanctioned Asensio & Company Inc. and Manuel Asensio, for Short Selling, Trade Reporting, and Internet Advertising Violations.

In July 2006, the National Adjudicatory Council of the NASD upheld a hearing panel's ruling that barred Asensio "from association with any NASD member in any capacity" and fined him $20,000. The NASD barred Asensio and his firm for failing to respond to requests for information concerning Polymedica. It found that Asensio made statements in research reports that criticized PolyMedica Corp that were "misleading," by stating incorrectly that he was shorting the company when he was not, and by making similar disclosure rule violations. Asensio denied any wrongdoing and all appeals were denied.

In August 2007, Asensio Brokerage Services, Inc. (now known as Integral Securities, Inc.) was expelled by FINRA for failure to pay fines and/or costs.

As a result of a controversy over Asensio's role in the short selling of Polymedica FINRA imposed a fine and Asensio disbanded his broker-dealer operation. Subsequently, FINRA barred Asensio from membership.

Polymedica filed for bankruptcy in 2013.
