= Bryan Corbett =

American attorney, businessman, and presidential appointee

- Born: United States
- Education: University of Notre Dame, George Washington University Law School
- Occupation: Business executive
- Known for: President and CEO Managed Funds Association

Bryan Corbett is an attorney and American business executive who is the president and CEO of Managed Funds Association (MFA). He was previously a presidential appointee in the Bush administration and a private equity executive.

== Political career ==
Corbett began his career as a securities lawyer at Wilmer Hale following his clerkship at the U.S. Court of Appeals for the Fourth Circuit. Corbett then went into public service as Majority Counsel on the Senate Banking Committee from 2003–2005, under chairman Richard Shelby (R-AL). Corbett served as the policy lead on securities and capital markets at the committee.

Corbett then served in the George W. Bush Administration from 2005–2008, first as senior advisor to Deputy Secretary Robert Kimmitt at the Treasury Department, then as a special assistant to the president for economic policy, and as a White House National Economic Council member.

In 2008 Corbett joined The Carlyle Group, a global investment firm, where he served as a partner advising on governmental and regulatory issues encompassing Carlyle acquisitions and portfolio companies. Corbett also served on the boards of several Carlyle portfolio companies, including One Carlyle, a global investment firm that manages over $380 billion in assets.

== Managed Funds Association ==
In January 2020, Corbett joined Managed Funds Association (MFA), a global trade association for the alternative asset management industry, as president and CEO. As president and CEO of the organization, Corbett launched the Association’s first public education campaign spending millions to educate lawmakers, regulators, and the public about the benefits of hedge funds. Corbett has led numerous efforts to aggressively push back on SEC regulations on the alternative management industry, including preparing for litigation against the industry regulator.

Corbett has publicly defended the utility of private credit investment options, arguing in a Bloomberg opinion piece against the claim that such funds pose risks to the financial system and instead provides stability to the economy.

Corbett has also been a vocal defender of short selling. In the aftermath of the 2023 United States banking crisis, Corbett responded to financial institutions pressuring the Biden Administration and SEC Chair Gary Gensler to "potentially issue a temporary ban – on short-selling strategies", arguing such a ban would be "regulatory malpractice".

In response to UK Treasury seeking feedback on the financial regulations, Corbett argued that current regulations with a "low disclosure threshold that publicly identifies who is shorting a specific company is harmful to markets" and "public disclosure of short positions should be provided in aggregate so an investor can better understand the full picture of a company’s valuation without having to wade through misleading signals".

== Education ==
Corbett earned his Juris Doctor (JD) degree from George Washington University Law School, where he was the George Washington Law Review editor-in-chief. He completed his Bachelor of Arts degree at the University of Notre Dame.
