= Novation Companies =

American business

Novation Companies, Inc.
- Type: Public
- Traded as: Template:OTCQB was
- Founded: 1996
- Headquarters: Kansas City, Missouri, United States
- Website: www.novationcompanies.com

Novation Companies, Inc. (formerly Novastar Financial, Inc.) owns and operates early-stage businesses in the technology-enabled services industry. It trades under the symbol NOVC.

== History ==
Novation Companies, Inc., (NOVC) was founded as NovaStar Financial, Inc., a Kansas City-based residential mortgage company, in 1996. Through its subsidiaries, NovaStar Mortgage, Inc., and NovaStar Home Mortgage, Inc., it originated, securitized and serviced residential loans.

During a 10-year period, NovaStar Mortgage originated more than $40 billion in mortgage loans and NovaStar Home had more than 400 branches nationwide. The company had nearly 5,000 employees at one point. The company went public 10 months after opening.

From 2003 to 2006, the total number of subprime loans issued in the U.S. increased by 17 percent. However, NovaStar’s business model proved unsustainable for the long term as more and more people defaulted on loans. NovaStar's business model is considered one of the primary factors that led to the credit crisis of 2008.

NovaStar rode the economic storm to its low, and exited the mortgage lending business completely by 2008. The company’s stock price dropped from nearly $70 a share to under $1 and was delisted from the New York Stock Exchange by 2008. The employee base shrank to approximately 20. The company then changed its name to Novation Companies, Inc. to avoid association with NovaStar's losses.

Other than CorvisaCloud, Novation has either sold or otherwise liquidated all of its operating subsidiaries. Currently, Novation is focused solely on developing the business of CorvisaCloud.

== Subsidiaries (current and former) ==
=== Corvisa Cloud ===
Corvisa Cloud, LLC is located in Milwaukee and offers cloud-based IVR, ACD and call center operations.

=== StreetLinks Lender Solutions ===
StreetLinks LLC, dba StreetLinks Lender Solutions, offers a suite of appraisal/valuation solutions for mortgage industry professionals nationwide.

StreetLinks was Novation's first and largest subsidiary. It grew from 15 employees to more than 600 after being acquired by Novation. In 2009, StreetLinks had significant increases in both revenue and net income over the previous year.

On April 16, 2014, the Company and non-controlling members of StreetLinks entered into a purchase and sale agreement with Assurant Services, LLC, a subsidiary of Assurant, Inc., pursuant to which Assurant purchased 100% of the outstanding membership units of StreetLinks in exchange for $60.0 million paid in cash at closing and up to $12.0 million in post-closing (consideration contingent upon the total revenue of StreetLinks in fiscal years 2015 and 2016). The sale closed on April 16, 2014.

=== Advent Financial Services ===
Advent Financial Services, LLC provided financial settlement services for income tax preparation businesses and access to tailored banking accounts, small-dollar banking products and related services to meet the needs of low- and moderate-income-level individuals.

On August 18, 2014, Advent sold certain intellectual property, software, and customer data to Santa Barbara Tax Products Group, LLC. Also on August 18, 2014, the Company announced that it was conducting an orderly winding-down of Advent’s remaining business and operations.

=== Corvisa Services ===
Corvisa Services LLC is based in Milwaukee and provides software development, technology, marketing and training services to the Novation group of companies.

=== Mango Moving ===
Mango Moving LLC offered long-distance moving and nationwide moving storage, as well as à la carte long-distance moving. Novation acquired Mango in 2011.

Due to continued capital demands and difficulties generating positive cash flows or earnings, effective February 27, 2013, the Company committed to a plan to abandon the operations of Mango, which comprised the Company's entire Logistics segment. The run-off operations of Mango ceased during the first quarter of 2013, and the Company will not have any significant continuing involvement in Mango.

== End of NovaStar's mortgage lending ==
NovaStar originated and serviced "nonconforming" residential loans to borrowers who generally did not qualify for conventional mortgages.

NovaStar retained interests in the nonconforming loans it originated and purchased through its mortgage securities investment portfolio and was taxed as a real estate investment trust. Exposed by the subprime mortgage crisis, NovaStar ceased lending operations at the end of 2007.

Its four operating units were mortgage portfolio management, mortgage lending, loan servicing and branch operations. It no longer originates mortgages, and all servicing rights were sold to Saxon Mortgage Services, Inc.

== Legal action ==
In 2006, forty shareholders in NovaStar sued ten Wall Street prime brokers, claiming a scheme to manipulate the companies' stock by allowing naked short selling.

On March 20, 2007, the law office of Howard G Smith initiated a class action suit on behalf of investors against certain executive officers of NovaStar for inflating the stock price by deceptively reporting the company's financials. On April 2, 2007, the law office of Keller Rohrback initiated a class action suit on behalf of NovaStar 401(k) plan members on similar grounds. A third class action concerning NovaStar's charging of yield spread premium fees, fees paid by the lender to the broker which has come under notable criticism, was set to go to trial in May 2007. On June 21, 2007, NovaStar's residential lending unit paid out $5.1 million to settle this lawsuit that accused it of charging higher rates because of hidden fees paid to mortgage brokers. The company was not required to admit any wrongdoing.

On September 12, 2008, a petition for involuntary bankruptcy was filed against subsidiary NovaStar Mortgage Inc. by its financial backers after the company repeatedly failed to pay interest on loans. NovaStar Financial announced that it intends to contest the petition on all available grounds, stating that should the petition be carried out it "would likely cause NFI to seek the protection of applicable bankruptcy laws". NovaStar paid $2 million to American InterBanc to have the involuntary bankruptcy removed from the lawsuit filed in 2002 that charged NovaStar with false advertising and unfair competition.

On November 7, 2008, a lawsuit was filed on behalf of purchasers of NovaStar Home Equity Loan Asset-Backed Certificates who bought them following the May 25, 2006 Registration Statement. It alleged misstatements and omissions about the backing of the securities that materially affected their value.

In 2016, Novation Companies filed for Chapter 11 bankruptcy for a second time. On August 13, 2023, Novation Companies went bankrupt for the third time, with assets listed as less than $0.05 million and liabilities listed at around $50 million to $100 million.
