= Donal Smith (CEO) =

Irish chief executive

- Occupation: Co-founder
- Employer: Credit Benchmark

Donal Smith is the co-founder of Credit Benchmark, a credit risk data and analytics provider, and co-founder of Camwell Management LLP, which invests in high-growth data, technology and information businesses. He was previously CEO of Data Explorers which was sold to Markit in 2012.

On 11 Feb 2012, Donal Smith was announced as a non-executive director of Trinity Mirror. He is also chairman of Selerity.

Before Data Explorers, Smith was CEO of Thomson Financial in Europe and Asia, Group Managing Director at the Financial Times and CEO of eCountries.
