= Locate (finance) =

In finance, a locate is an approval from a broker that needs to be obtained prior to effecting a short sale in any equity security, i.e. to "locate" securities available for borrowing.

The requirement, in the United States, to locate a stock before 'shorting' has existed for a long time.

Regulation SHO was announced by the SEC in July 2004. The rule includes a uniform "locate" requirement for short sales in all equity securities and a requirement for the firms to document what they have done to locate the securities. Regardless of whether the seller's short position may be closed out by purchasing securities the same day, firms will need to document that they have borrowed or arranged to borrow the stock, or they have reasonable grounds to believe they can borrow the stock and deliver on delivery date.

Market makers effecting short sales in connection with bona fide market making are exempt from this requirement. In addition broker-dealers can rely on "easy to borrow" lists to satisfy the "reasonable grounds" requirement, provided the information used to generate such lists is less than 24 hours old and the securities included on the list are so readily available that it is unlikely the seller will fail to deliver securities on settlement date, but may not rely on the fact that a security is not on a “hard-to-borrow” list to satisfy the test.

Each short sale must be matched to a corresponding locate. However, it is not necessary to secure a locate in the same broker – the ability of a short seller to prove a secured locate at any broker is sufficient to validate a short sale.

Since a locate is not a guarantee that security can be borrowed, there exists a threat there may not actually be actual securities that can be borrowed, resulting in so-called naked short. These can be extremely dangerous to the marketand can unnecessarily bring down prices. Responding to such threat, in July 2008 SEC issued an emergency ruling where locates for certain securities had to be backed up by a guaranteed pre-borrow
