= Naked short selling =

Short-selling practice

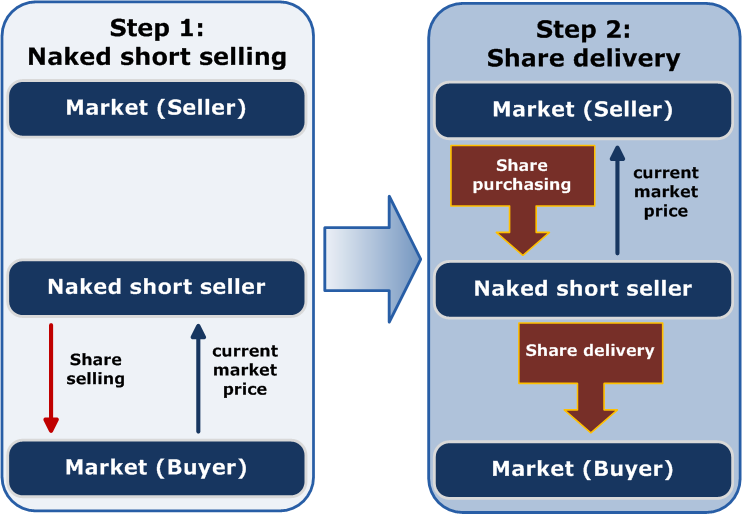
Schematic representation of naked short selling of stock shares in two steps. The short seller sells shares without owning them. They later purchase and deliver the shares for a different market price. If the short seller cannot afford the shares in the second step, or the shares are not available, a "fail to deliver" results.

Naked short selling, or naked shorting, is the practice of short-selling a tradable asset without first borrowing the asset from another party or ensuring that it can be borrowed. When the seller does not obtain the asset and deliver it to the buyer within the required settlement period, the result is known as a "failure to deliver" (FTD). The transaction generally remains open until the asset is acquired and delivered by the seller, or the seller's broker settles the trade on their behalf.

Short selling is typically used to take advantage of arbitrage opportunities or to anticipate a price decline, but it exposes the seller to unlimited risk if the price rises instead.

Critics have long called for stricter regulations of naked short selling. In the United States, the Securities and Exchange Commission (SEC) adopted "Regulation SHO" in 2005, requiring broker-dealers to have a reasonable belief that a borrowed security will be available before executing a short sale, and mandating timely delivery of shares.

In July 2008, amid escalating financial instability, the SEC issued a temporary order restricting short sales of shares in 19 systemically important financial institutions, strengthening penalties for failures to deliver. On September 18, following the collapse of Lehman Brothers, these restrictions were extended to all U.S. listed companies, including market makers. Later that year, the SEC formally banned what it called "abusive" naked short selling, although naked shorting itself remains not per se illegal under certain technical circumstances, such as bona fide market making activities.

In August 2008, the SEC issued a temporary order restricting short-selling in the shares of 19 financial firms deemed systemically important, by reinforcing the penalties for failing to deliver the shares in time. Effective September 18, amid claims that aggressive short selling had played a role in the failure of financial giant Lehman Brothers, the SEC extended and expanded the rules to remove exceptions and to cover all companies, including market makers.

A 2014 peer-reviewed study by researchers at the University at Buffalo, published in the Journal of Financial Economics, concluded that failures to deliver did not cause price distortions or financial firms' failures during the 2008 financial crisis. Instead the authors found the larger FTDs increased liquidity and pricing efficiency, with effects comparable to those of conventional short sales".

Despite regulations, some market commentators have argued that naked shorting remains widespread and that enforcement of SEC rules is weak. Critics contended that the practice can be abused to manipulate stock prices, damage companies' ability to raise capital, and contribute to bankruptcies. Conversely, opponents of stricter regulation argue that concerns of naked shorting are overstated, describing them as a "devil theory", and an inefficient use of regulatory resources.

== Description ==
=== "Normal" shorting ===
Short selling is a form of speculation that allows a trader to take a "negative position" in a stock of a company. Such a trader first borrows shares of that stock from their owner (the lender), typically via a bank or a prime broker under the condition that they will return them on demand. Next, the trader sells the borrowed shares and delivers them to the buyer who becomes their new owner. The buyer is typically unaware that the shares have been sold short: their transaction with the trader proceeds just as if the trader owned rather than borrowed the shares. Some time later, the trader closes their short position by purchasing the same number of shares in the market and returning them to the lender.

The trader's profit is the difference between the sale price and the purchase price of the shares. In contrast to "going long" where sale succeeds the purchase, short sale precedes the purchase. Because the seller/borrower is generally required to make a cash deposit equivalent to the sale proceeds, it offers the lender some security.

=== Naked shorts in the United States ===
Naked short selling is a case of short selling without first arranging a borrow. If the stock is in short supply, finding shares to borrow can be difficult. The seller may also decide not to borrow the shares, in some cases because lenders are not available, or because the costs of lending are too high. When shares are not borrowed within the clearing time period and the short-seller does not tender shares to the buyer, the trade is considered to have "failed to deliver". Nevertheless, the trade will continue to sit open or the buyer may be credited the shares by the DTCC until the short-seller either closes out the position or borrows the shares.

It is difficult to measure how often naked short selling occurs. Fails to deliver are not necessarily indicative of naked shorting, and can result from both "long" transactions (stock purchases) and short sales. Naked shorting can be invisible in a liquid market, as long as the short sale is eventually delivered to the buyer. However, if the covers are impossible to find, the trades fail. Fail reports are published regularly by the SEC, and a sudden rise in the number of fails-to-deliver will alert the SEC to the possibility of naked short selling. In some recent cases, it was claimed that the daily activity was larger than all of the available shares, which would normally be unlikely.

==== Extent of naked shorting ====
The reasons for naked shorting, and the extent of it, had been disputed for several years before the SEC's 2008 action to prohibit the practice. What is generally recognized is that naked shorting tends to happen when shares are difficult to borrow. Studies have shown that naked short selling also increases with the cost of borrowing.

A Los Angeles Times editorial in July 2008 said that naked short selling "enables speculators to drive down a company's stock by offering an overwhelming number of shares for sale".

The SEC has stated that naked shorting is sometimes falsely asserted as a reason for a share price decline, when, often, "the price decrease is a result of the company's poor financial situation rather than the reasons provided by the insiders or promoters."

Before 2008, regulators had generally downplayed the extent of naked shorting in the US. At a North American Securities Administrators Association (NASAA) conference on naked short selling in November 2005, an official of the New York Stock Exchange stated that NYSE had not found evidence of widespread naked short selling. In 2006, an official of the SEC said that "While there may be instances of abusive short selling, 99% of all trades in dollar value settle on time without incident." Of all those that do not, 85% are resolved within 10 business days and 90% within 20. That means that about 1% of shares that change hands daily, or about $1 billion per day, are subject to delivery failures, although the SEC has stated that "fails-to-deliver can occur for a number of reasons on both long and short sales", and accordingly that they do not necessarily indicate naked short selling.

In 2008, SEC chairman Christopher Cox said that the SEC "has zero tolerance for abusive naked short-selling" while implementing new regulations to prohibit the practice, culminating in the September 2008 action following the failures of Bear Stearns and Lehman Brothers amidst speculation that naked short selling had played a contributory role. Cox said that "the rule would be designed to ensure transparency in short-selling in general, beyond the practice of naked short-selling."

==== Claimed effects of naked shorting ====
The SEC is committed to maintaining orderly securities markets. The abusive practice of naked short selling is far different from ordinary short selling, which is a healthy and necessary part of a free market. Our agency’s rules are highly supportive of short selling, which can help quickly transmit price signals in response to negative information or prospects for a company. Short selling helps prevent "irrational exuberance" and bubbles. But when someone fails to borrow and deliver the securities needed to make good on a short position, after failing even to determine that they can be borrowed, that is not contributing to an orderly market – it is undermining it. And in the context of a potential "distort and short" campaign aimed at an otherwise sound financial institution, this kind of manipulative activity can have drastic consequences.

— Speech by SEC Chairman Christopher Cox

As with the prevalence of naked shorting, the effects are contested. The SEC has stated that the practice can be beneficial in enhancing liquidity in difficult-to-borrow shares, while others have suggested that it adds efficiency to the securities lending market. Critics of the practice argue that it is often used for market manipulation, that it can damage companies and even that it threatens the broader markets.

One complaint about naked shorting from targeted companies is that the practice dilutes a company's shares for as long as unsettled short sales sit open on the books. This has been alleged to create "phantom" or "counterfeit" shares, sometimes going from trade to trade without connection to any physical shares, and artificially depressing the share price. However, the SEC has disclaimed the existence of counterfeit shares and stated that naked short selling would not increase a company's outstanding shares. Short seller David Rocker contended that failure to deliver securities "can be done for manipulative purposes to create the impression that the stock is a tight borrow", although he said that this should be seen as a failure to deliver "longs" rather than "shorts".

Robert J. Shapiro, former undersecretary of commerce for economic affairs, and a consultant to a law firm suing over naked shorting, has claimed that naked short selling has cost investors $100 billion and driven 1,000 companies into the ground.

Richard Fuld, the former CEO of the financial firm Lehman Brothers, during hearings on the bankruptcy filing by Lehman Brothers and bailout of AIG before the House Committee on Oversight and Government Reform alleged that a host of factors including a crisis of confidence and naked short selling attacks followed by false rumors contributed to the collapse of both Bear Stearns and Lehman Brothers. Fuld had been obsessed with short sellers and had even demoted those Lehman executives that dealt with them; he claimed that the short sellers and the rumour mongers had brought down Lehman, although he had no evidence of it. Upon the examination of the issue of whether "naked short selling" was in any way a cause of the collapse of Bear Stearns or Lehman, securities experts reached the conclusion that the alleged "naked short sales" occurred after the collapse and therefore played no role in it. House committee Chairman Henry Waxman said the committee received thousands of pages of internal documents from Lehman and these documents portray a company in which there was "no accountability for failure". In July 2008, U.S. Securities and Exchange Commission chairman Christopher Cox said there was no "unbridled naked short selling in financial issues".

== Regulations by market ==
Several international exchanges have either partially or fully restricted the practice of naked short selling of shares. They include Australia's Australian Securities Exchange, India's Securities and Exchange Board, the Netherlands's Euronext Amsterdam, Japan's Tokyo Stock Exchange, and Switzerland's SWX Swiss Exchange. Also Spain's securities regulator CNMV.

In August 2011, France, Italy, Spain, Belgium and South Korea temporally banned all short selling in their financial stocks, while Germany pushed for a eurozone-wide ban on naked short selling.

=== Germany ===
On May 18, 2010, the German Minister of Finance announced that naked short sales of euro-denominated government bonds, credit default swaps based on those bonds, and shares in Germany's ten leading financial institutions will be prohibited. This ban went into effect that night and was set to expire on March 31, 2011. On May 28, German financial market regulator BaFin announced that this ban would be permanent. The ban became effective July 27, 2010. The International Monetary Fund issued a report in August 2010 saying that the measure succeeded only in impeding the markets. It said the ban "did relatively little to support the targeted institutions’ underlying stock prices, while liquidity dropped and volatility rose substantially." The IMF said there was no strong evidence that stock prices fell because of shorting.

=== India ===
In March 2007, the Securities and Exchange Board of India (SEBI), which disallowed short sales altogether in 2001 as a result of the Ketan Parekh affair, reintroduced short selling under regulations similar to those developed in the United States. In conjunction with this rule change, SEBI outlawed all naked short selling.

=== Japan ===
Japan's naked shorting ban started on November 4, 2008, and was originally scheduled to run until July 2009, but was extended through October of that year. Japan's Finance Minister, Shōichi Nakagawa stated, "We decided (to move up the short-selling ban) as we thought it could be dangerous for the Tokyo stock market if we do not take action immediately." Nakagawa added that Japan's Financial Services Agency would be teaming with the Securities and Exchange Surveillance Commission and Tokyo Stock Exchange to investigate past violations of Japanese regulations on stock short-selling. The ban was subsequently extended through October 2010.

=== Singapore ===
The Singapore Exchange started to penalize naked short sales with an interim measure in September, 2008. These initial penalties started at $100 per day. In November, they announced plans to increase the fines for failing to complete trades. The new penalties would penalize traders who fail to cover their positions, starting at $1,000 per day. There would also be fines for brokerages who fail to use the exchange's buying-in market to cover their positions, starting at $5,000 per day. The Singapore exchange had stated that the failure to deliver shares inherent in naked short sales threatened market orderliness.

=== United States ===
==== Securities Exchange Act of 1934 ====
The Securities Exchange Act of 1934 stipulates a settlement period up to two business days before a stock needs to be delivered, generally referred to as "T+2 delivery".

==== Regulation SHO ====
The SEC enacted Regulation SHO in January 2005 to target abusive naked short selling by reducing FTD securities, and by limiting the time in which a broker can permit failures to deliver. In addressing the first, it stated that a broker or dealer may not accept a short sale order without having first borrowed or identified the stock being sold. The rule had the following exemptions:

1. Broker or dealer accepting a short sale order from another registered broker or dealer
2. Bona fide market making
3. Broker-dealer effecting a sale on behalf of a customer that is deemed to own the security pursuant to Rule 200 through no fault of the customer or the broker-dealer.

To reduce the duration for which fails to deliver are permitted to sit open, the regulation requires broker-dealers to close out open fail-to-deliver positions in threshold securities that have persisted for 13 consecutive settlement days. The SEC, in describing Regulation SHO, stated that failures to deliver shares that persist for an extended period of time "may result in large delivery obligations where stock settlement occurs".

Regulation SHO also created the "Threshold Security List", which reported any stock where more than 0.5% of a company's total outstanding shares failed delivery for five consecutive days. A number of companies have appeared on the list, including Krispy Kreme, Martha Stewart Omnimedia and Delta Air Lines. The Motley Fool, an investment website, observes that "when a stock appears on this list, it is like a red flag waving, stating 'something is wrong here!'" However, the SEC clarified that appearance on the threshold list "does not necessarily mean that there has been abusive naked short selling or any impermissible trading in the stock".

In July 2006, the SEC proposed to amend Regulation SHO, to further reduce failures to deliver securities. SEC Chairman Christopher Cox referred to "the serious problem of abusive naked short sales, which can be used as a tool to drive down a company's stock price" and that the SEC is "concerned about the persistent failures to deliver in the market for some securities that may be due to loopholes in Regulation SHO".

==== Developments 2007–2010 ====
In June 2007, the SEC voted to remove the grandfather provision that allowed fails-to-deliver that existed before Reg SHO to be exempt from Reg SHO. SEC Chairman Christopher Cox called naked short selling "a fraud that the commission is bound to prevent and to punish". The SEC also said it was considering removing an exemption from the rule for options market makers. Removal of the grandfather provision and naked shorting restrictions generally have been endorsed by the U.S. Chamber of Commerce.

In March 2008, SEC Chairman Christopher Cox gave a speech entitled the "'Naked' Short Selling Anti-Fraud Rule", in which he announced new SEC efforts to combat naked short selling. Under the proposal, the SEC would create an antifraud rule targeting those who knowingly deceive brokers about having located securities before engaging in short sales, and who fail to deliver the securities by the delivery date. Cox said the proposal would address concerns about short-selling abuses, particularly in the market for small-cap stocks. Even with the regulation in place, the SEC received hundreds of complaints in 2007 about alleged abuses involving short sales. The SEC estimated that about 1% of shares that changed hands daily, about $1 billion, were subject to delivery failures. SEC Commissioners Paul Atkins and Kathleen Casey expressed support for the crackdown.

In mid-July 2008, the SEC announced emergency actions to limit the naked short selling of government sponsored enterprises (GSEs), such as Fannie Mae and Freddie Mac, in an effort to limit market volatility of financial stocks. But even with respect to those stocks the SEC soon thereafter announced there would be an exception with regard to market makers. SEC Chairman Cox noted that the emergency order was "not a response to unbridled naked short selling in financial issues", saying that "that has not occurred". Cox said, "rather it is intended as a preventative step to help restore market confidence at a time when it is sorely needed." Analysts warned of the potential for the creation of price bubbles.

The emergency actions rule expired August 12, 2008. However, on September 17, 2008, the SEC issued new, more extensive rules against naked shorting, making "it crystal clear that the SEC has zero tolerance for abusive naked short selling". Among the new rules is that market makers are no longer given an exception. As a result, options market makers will be treated in the same way as all other market participants, and effectively will be banned from naked short selling.

On November 4, 2008, voters in South Dakota considered a ballot initiative, "The South Dakota Small Investor Protection Act", to end naked short selling in that state. The Securities Industry and Financial Markets Association of Washington and New York said they would take legal action if the measure passed. The voters defeated the initiative.

In July 2009, the SEC, under what the Wall Street Journal described as "intense political pressure", made permanent an interim rule that obliges brokerages to promptly buy or borrow securities when executing a short sale. The SEC said that since the fall of 2008, abusive naked short selling had been reduced by 50%, and the number of threshold list securities (equity securities with too many "fails to deliver") declined from 582 in July 2008 to 63 in March 2009.

In January 2010, Mary Schapiro, chairperson of the SEC, testified before the U.S. Financial Crisis Inquiry Commission that fails to deliver in equity securities had declined 63.4 percent, while persistent and large fails had declined 80.5 percent.

== Regulatory enforcement actions ==
In 2005, the SEC notified Refco of intent to file an enforcement action against the securities unit of Refco for securities trading violations concerning the shorting of Sedona stock. The SEC sought information related to two former Refco brokers who handled the account of a client, Amro International, which shorted Sedona's stock. No charges had been filed by 2007.

In December 2006, the SEC sued Gryphon Partners, a hedge fund, for insider trading and naked short-selling involving PIPEs in the unregistered stock of 35 companies. PIPEs are "private investments in public equities", used by companies to raise cash. The naked shorting took place in Canada, where it was legal at the time. Gryphon denied the charges.

In March 2007, Goldman Sachs was fined $2 million by the SEC for allowing customers to illegally sell shares short prior to secondary public offerings. Naked short-selling was allegedly used by the Goldman clients. The SEC charged Goldman with failing to ensure those clients had ownership of the shares. SEC Chairman Cox said "That is an important case and it reflects our interest in this area."

In July 2007, Piper Jaffray was fined $150,000 by the New York Stock Exchange (NYSE). Piper violated securities trading rules from January through May 2005, selling shares without borrowing them, and also failing to "cover short sales in a timely manner", according to the NYSE. At the time of this fine, the NYSE had levied over $1.9 million in fines for naked short sales over seven regulatory actions.

Also in July 2007, the American Stock Exchange fined two options market makers for violations of Regulation SHO. SBA Trading was sanctioned for $5 million, and ALA Trading was fined $3 million, which included disgorgement of profits. Both firms and their principals were suspended from association with the exchange for five years. The exchange said the firms used an exemption to Reg. SHO for options market makers to "impermissibly engage in naked short selling".

In October 2007, the SEC settled charges against New York hedge fund adviser Sandell Asset Management Corp. and three executives of the firm for, among other things, shorting stock without locating shares to borrow. Fines totalling $8 million were imposed, and the firm neither admitted nor denied the charges.

In October 2008 Lehman Brothers Inc. was fined $250,000 by the Financial Industry Regulatory Authority (FINRA) for failing to properly document the ownership of short sales as they occurred, and for failing to annotate an affirmative declaration that shares would be available by the settlement date.

In April 2010 Goldman Sachs paid $450,000 to settle the SEC's allegations that it had failed to deliver "approximatedly" (sic) 86 short sells between early December 2008 and mid-January 2009, and that it had failed to institute adequate controls to prevent the failures. The company neither admitted nor denied any wrongdoing.

In May 2012, lawyers acting for Goldman accidentally released an unredacted document revealing compromising internal discussions regarding naked short selling. "Fuck the compliance area – procedures, schmecedures", Rolling Stone Magazine quoted Peter Melz, the former president of Merrill Lynch Professional Clearing Corp. as saying in the document.

== Litigation and DTCC ==
The Depository Trust & Clearing Corporation (DTCC) has been criticized by the Wall Street Journal for its approach to naked short selling. DTCC has been sued with regard to its alleged participation in naked short selling, and the issue of DTCC's possible involvement has been taken up by Senator Robert Bennett and discussed by the NASAA and in articles in The Wall Street Journal and Euromoney. There is no dispute that illegal naked shorting happens; what is in dispute is how much it happens, and to what extent is DTCC to blame. Some companies with falling stocks blame DTCC as the keeper of the system where it happens, and say DTCC turns a blind eye to the problem. Referring to trades that remain unsettled, DTCC's chief spokesman Stuart Goldstein said, "We're not saying there is no problem, but to suggest the sky is falling might be a bit overdone." In July 2007, Senator Bennett suggested on the U.S. Senate floor that the allegations involving DTCC and naked short selling are "serious enough" that there should be a hearing on them with DTCC officials by the Senate Banking Committee, and that banking committee chairman Christopher Dodd has expressed a willingness to hold such a hearing.

Critics also contend DTCC has been too secretive with information about where naked shorting is taking place. Ten suits concerning naked short-selling filed against the DTCC were withdrawn or dismissed by May 2005.

A suit by Electronic Trading Group, naming major Wall Street brokerages, was filed in April 2006 and dismissed in December 2007.

Two separate lawsuits, filed in 2006 and 2007 by NovaStar Financial, Inc. shareholders and Overstock.com, named as defendants ten Wall Street prime brokers. They claimed a scheme to manipulate the companies' stock by allowing naked short selling. A motion to dismiss the Overstock suit was denied in July 2007.

A suit against DTCC by Pet Quarters Inc. was dismissed by a federal court in Arkansas, and upheld by the Eighth Circuit Court of Appeals in March 2009. Pet Quarters alleged the Depository Trust & Clearing Corp.'s stock-borrow program resulted in the creation of nonexistent or phantom stock and contributed to the illegal short selling of the company's shares. The court ruled: "In short, all the damages that Pet Quarters claims to have suffered stem from activities performed or statements made by the defendants in conformity with the program's Commission approved rules. We conclude that the district court did not err in dismissing the complaint on the basis of preemption." Pet Quarters' complaint was almost identical to suits against DTCC brought by Whistler Investments Inc. and Nanopierce Technologies Inc. The suits also challenged DTCC's stock-borrow program, and were dismissed.

One scholar, in an article published in the New York University Journal of Law and Business, noted that "until a court declares naked short selling as market manipulation as a matter of law and clarifies the issuer's and investor's burdens in proving the occurrence of naked short selling, the practice will continue without a check from the judiciary."

== Studies ==
A study of trading in initial public offerings by two SEC staff economists, published in April 2007, found that excessive numbers of fails to deliver were not correlated with naked short selling. The authors of the study said that while the findings in the paper specifically concern IPO trading, "The results presented in this paper also inform a public debate surrounding the role of short selling and fails to deliver in price formation."

In contrast, a study by Leslie Boni in 2004 found correlation between "strategic delivery failures" and the cost of borrowing shares. The paper, which looked at a "unique dataset of the entire cross-section of U.S. equities", credited the initial recognition of strategic delivery fails to Richard Evans, Chris Geczy, David Musto and Adam Reed, and found its review to provide evidence consistent with their hypothesis that "market makers strategically fail to deliver shares when borrowing costs are high." A study by Autore, Boulton, and Braga-Alves examined stock returns around delivery failures between 2005 and 2008 and found evidence consistent with a positive link between delivery failures and borrowing costs.

An April 2007 study conducted for Canadian market regulators by Market Regulation Services Inc. found that fails to deliver securities were not a significant problem on the Canadian market, that "less than 6% of fails resulting from the sale of a security involved short sales" and that "fails involving short sales are projected to account for only 0.07% of total short sales.

A Government Accountability Office study, released in June 2009, found that recent SEC rules had apparently reduced abusive short selling, but that the SEC needed to give clearer guidance to the brokerage industry.

The Financial Crisis Inquiry Commission, appointed by Congress to investigate the 2008 financial crisis, makes no reference to naked shorting, or short-selling of financial stocks, in its conclusions.

A study of fails to deliver, published in the Journal of Financial Economics in 2014, found no evidence that FTDs "caused price distortions or the failure of financial firms during the 2008 financial crisis". Researchers studied 1,492 New York Stock Exchange stocks over a 42-month period from 2005 to 2008, and found that "greater FTDs lead to higher liquidity and pricing efficiency, and their impact is similar to our estimate of delivered short sales."

== Media coverage ==
Some journalists have expressed concern about naked short selling, while others contend that naked short selling is not harmful and that its prevalence has been exaggerated by corporate officials seeking to blame external forces for internal problems with their companies. Others have discussed naked short selling as a confusing or bizarre form of trading.

In June 2007, executives of Universal Express, which had claimed naked shorting of its stock, were sanctioned by a federal court judge for violation of securities laws. Referring to a court ruling against CEO Richard Altomare, New York Times columnist Floyd Norris said: "In Altomare's view, the issues that bothered the judge are irrelevant. Long and short of it, this is a naked short hallmark case in the making. Or it is proof that it can take a long time for the SEC to stop a fraud." Universal Express claimed that 6,000 small companies had been put out of business by naked shorting, which the company said "the SEC has ignored and condoned."

Reviewing the SEC's July 2008 emergency order, Barron's said in an editorial: "Rather than fixing any of the real problems with the agency and its mission, Cox and his fellow commissioners waved a newspaper and swatted the imaginary fly of naked short-selling. It made a big noise, but there's no dead bug." Holman Jenkins of The Wall Street Journal said the order was "an exercise in symbolic confidence-building" and that naked shorting involved technical concerns except for subscribers to a "devil theory". The Economist said the SEC had "picked the wrong target", mentioning a study by Arturo Bris of the Swiss International Institute for Management Development who found that trading in the 19 financial stocks became less efficient. The Washington Post expressed approval of the SEC's decision to address a "frenetic shadow world of postponed promises, borrowed time, obscured paperwork and nail-biting price-watching, usually compressed into a few high-tension days swirling around the decline of a company". The Los Angeles Times called the practice of naked short selling "hard to defend", and stated that it was past time the SEC became active in addressing market manipulation.

The Wall Street Journal said in an editorial in July 2008 that "the Beltway is shooting the messenger by questioning the price-setting mechanisms for barrels of oil and shares of stock." But it said the emergency order to bar naked short selling "won't do much harm", and said "Critics might say it's a solution to a nonproblem, but the SEC doesn't claim to be solving a problem. The Commission's move is intended to prevent even the possibility that an unscrupulous short seller could drive down the shares of a financial firm with a flood of sell orders that aren't backed by an actual ability to deliver the shares to buyers."

In an article in March 2009 Bloomberg News Service said that the Lehman Brothers bankruptcy may have been prevented by curbs on naked shorting. "[As] many as 32.8 million shares in the company were sold and not delivered to buyers on time as of Sept. 11, according to data compiled by the Securities and Exchange Commission".

In May 2009, the New York Times chief financial correspondent Floyd Norris reported that naked shorting is "almost gone". He said that delivery failures, where they occur, are quickly corrected.

In an article published in October 2009, Rolling Stone writer Matt Taibbi contended that Bear Stearns and Lehman Brothers were flooded with "counterfeit stock" that helped kill both companies. Taibbi said that the two firms got a "push" into extinction from "a flat-out counterfeiting scheme called naked short-selling". During a May 2010 discussion on the inclusion of "counterfeiting" in the charges filed against Icelandic bankers, the host Max Keiser speculated that the charge might refer to naked short selling because "naked short-selling is the same as counterfeiting, in that it is selling something that doesn't exist." A 2014 study of fails to deliver, published in the Journal of Financial Economics, found no evidence that fails contributed to "price distortions or the failure of financial firms during the 2008 financial crisis".

== See also ==
- Locate (finance)
- Market maker
- Securities lending
