= Data Explorers =

Data Explorers Limited
- Type: Private
- Industry: Financial
- Founded: 2002
- Founder: Charles Stopford Sackville & Mark Faulkner
- Headquarters: London, UK
- Number of locations: 4 offices in 3 countries
- Area served: Europe, Asia, US
- Key people: Donal Smith, Jonathan Morris, Charlotte Wall, Christopher Hanson, Len Welter
- Number of employees: 110
- Website: dataexplorers.com

Data Explorers is a privately owned financial data and software company headquartered in London, UK, with offices in New York, US, Edinburgh and Hong Kong. The company provides financial benchmarking information to the Securities lending Industry and short-side intelligence to the Investment Management community. The company has a global dataset covering $12 trillion of securities in the lending programs of over 20,000 institutional funds.

Data Explorers offers access to quantitative measurement of securities lending, performance, and risk. The company provides analytics and data compiled from trade and inventory data provided by market participants including Lenders, Beneficial Owners, Custodian Banks, Agency Lenders, Borrowers, Hedge Funds and Broker Dealers.

== History ==
Data Explorers was established in 2002 by Charles Stopford Sackville and Mark Faulkner, the author of the Guide to Securities Lending Markets. Donal Smith, formerly of Thomson Reuters, was announced as CEO on 4 March 2008.

It is owned by the private equity firm Bowmark Capital.

Data Explorers was ranked 27th amongst the top 30 fastest growing UK private equity backed companies in The Sunday Times Deloitte Buyout Track 100 on 8 February 2011.

Data Explorers was voted the Best Information/Data Provider at the GSL Securities Lending Industry Awards on 4 November 2011, for the third year in a row.

At the twelfth annual techMARK awards on 17 November 2011, Data Explorers won the Emerging Star Award.

At the Financial World Innovation Awards on 2 December 2011, Data Explorers won the Information Provision Award for the Data Explorers News service.

2 April 2012: Markit, a leading, global financial information services company, announced the acquisition of Data Explorers, a leading provider of global securities lending data, from mid-market private equity firm Bowmark Capital.

== Services and products ==
The Data Explorers database tracks $12 trillion of lendable securities, with $2 trillion of loan balances on average covering 30,000 equities, 40,000 corporate bonds and 80,000 government bonds. The company products include APIs, Data Feeds, Excel Toolkits, Mobile Apps, web-based platforms and channel partners including Bloomberg LLC, Thomson Reuters, Factset, Markit and Capital IQ.

Data Explorers data is used as a proxy for short interest data by the mainstream media, including The Financial Times, The Economist, The Wall Street Journal, and Bloomberg

Thomson Reuters partnered with Data Explorers on 11 March 2009, to provide short-side intelligence to investor relations professionals.

On 12 June 2009, Data Explorers partnered with Factset to provide short selling analysis and securities finance data to Factset Research System's analytics platform.

Markit announced a new index on 16 September 2009, the Markit Data Explorers U.S. Sector Sentiment Index, that reflects sector-level investor sentiment derived from securities lending and short-selling information.

Data Explorers COO, Jonathan Morris, announced a partnership with Bloomberg L.P. on 23 September 2010 providing global long and short fund flow content to users of the Bloomberg Professional Service

On 6 October 2010, the Financial Times website www.ft.com included short selling activity from Data Explorers alongside market data on the Company pages and Stock screener

Nasdaq OMX announced a new index based on Data Explorers stock loan information to replicate return and volatility characteristic of the Nasdaq-100 Index on 5 May 2011. The index screens out stocks with low liquidity or those that are relatively expensive to borrow in the share-lending market.

On 19 September 2011, Data Explorers and Deltix announced that Data Explorers securities lending and repo data is available in the Deltix QuantOffice platform.

Capital IQ, the data and analytics arm of Standard & Poor's announced new content from Data Explorers added to its market data platform and Xpressfeed data management service on 26 September 2011.

Data Explorers and Direct Edge announced a partnership on 6 October 2011, after integrating daily securities lending information onto the Direct Edge market data distribution platform.

On 23 January 2012, Data Explorers announced a partnership with Narrative Science to create a securities lending newswire using an artificial intelligence system.

Data Explorers launched the first iPhone app for the securities finance industry on 31 January 2012, for Hedge Funds, Prime Brokers and Custodians to access daily information on 3 million transactions.

On 5 February 2012, Data Explorers was ranked for the second year in a row in the Sunday Times Deloitte Buyout Track 100.
