= Managed Funds Association =

Asset management trade association

MFA
- Formation: 1991; 35 years ago
- Type: Industry trade group
- Legal status: 501(c)(6) nonprofit organization
- Purpose: A global trade association for the alternative investment industry and its investors.
- Headquarters: Washington, DC, United States
- Region served: Worldwide
- President and CEO: Bryan Corbett
- Board Chair: Natalie A. Birrell
- Main organ: Executive Board
- Website: www.mfaalts.org
- Formerly called: Managed Funds Association

MFA, (formerly Managed Funds Association), is a Washington, DC–based industry group representing the alternative asset management industry.

It was founded in 1991 and is considered a leading financial services trade association. The association describes itself as advocating for "public policies that foster efficient, transparent, fair capital markets, and competitive tax and regulatory structures."

== History ==
In 1991, the National Association of Futures Trading Advisors (NAFTA) and the Managed Futures Trading Association (MFTA) combined to create the Managed Futures Association. In 1997, MFA changed its name to the Managed Funds Association in recognition of the broadening scope of the managed futures investment space and to include alternative trading outside of the exclusive use of futures. MFA initially had offices in New York City and Washington, D.C.

In 2022, MFA expanded its global presence by opening an office in Brussels, its first permanent presence outside the United States. In Spring 2023, MFA opened an office in London to further represent MFA members’ interests and deepen engagement with UK policymakers. In January 2024, the Managed Funds Association changed its name to simply ‘MFA’ to reflect its expanding membership.

== Mission ==
MFA’s mission is to advance the ability of alternative asset managers to raise capital, invest, and generate returns for their beneficiaries. As part of this mission, MFA provides its members with services and information regarding industry initiatives, developments, and sound practices; serves as a forum for identifying issues of common concern and developing solutions; engages policymakers and the media in dialogue regarding the industry; and offers targeted educational programs and publications to ensure informed governmental policymaking and balanced reporting by the press.

MFA's research provides members and the public with a variety of information on the trends and impacts of the private funds and alternative investments industry. The organization produces reports, white papers, and other products to provide insights into the role of alternative investment funds in capital markets around the world.

== Membership ==
MFA provides industry leadership through

- government relations, advocacy, and legislative affairs;
- communications;
- education for members, policymakers, the public, and investors.

The organization represents over 160 leading alternative asset management companies that utilize many strategies including: long/short equity, event-driven investing, arbitrage (e.g. fixed-income, convertible bond, risk, statistical), distressed securities, global macro, managed futures (e.g. commodities futures trading (CTAs)), multi-strategy trading, quantitative, volatility trading, and other fund strategies. 80 percent of funds with over $1 billion in assets under management are MFA members.

== Leadership ==
Bryan Corbett is MFA's President and CEO. Corbett began his tenure in January 2020 after serving as a senior executive at The Carlyle Group. Corbett previously served in the George W. Bush administration as Special Assistant to the President for Economic Policy and Senior Adviser to the Deputy Secretary of the U.S. Department of Treasury. He also worked as counsel of the U.S. Senate Committee on Banking, Housing, and Urban Affairs under Chairman Richard Shelby. Corbett earned his JD from George Washington University Law School, where he was editor-in-chief of the George Washington Law Review, and earned his BA from University of Notre Dame.

MFA's Board of Directors manages the business and affairs of the association. Board members are representatives of MFA member companies. The Board Chair is Natalie A. Birrell (Anchorage Capital Group).
