= Asset pricing =

How equities and debt instruments are valued

Asset pricing models
Regime Asset class	Equilibrium pricing	Risk neutral pricing
Equities (and foreign exchange and commodities; interest rates for risk neutral pricing)	Capital asset pricing model; Consumption-based CAPM; Intertemporal CAPM; Single-index model; Multiple factor models; Fama–French three-factor model; Carhart four-factor model; Arbitrage pricing theory	Black–Scholes; Black; Garman–Kohlhagen; Heston; CEV; SABR; Korn-Kreer-Lenssen
Bonds, other interest rate instruments	Vasicek; Rendleman–Bartter; Cox–Ingersoll–Ross	Ho–Lee; Hull–White; Black–Derman–Toy; Black–Karasinski; Kalotay–Williams–Fabozzi; Longstaff–Schwartz; Chen; Rendleman–Bartter; Heath–Jarrow–Morton; Cheyette; Brace–Gatarek–Musiela; LIBOR market model

In financial economics, asset pricing refers to the formal development of the principles used in pricing, together with the resultant models. The treatment develops the interrelated paradigms of general equilibrium asset pricing and rational asset pricing, the latter corresponding to risk neutral pricing.

Investment theory, which is near synonymous, encompasses the body of knowledge used to support the decision-making process of choosing investments, and the asset pricing models are then applied in determining the asset-specific required rate of return on the investment in question, and for hedging.

== General equilibrium asset pricing ==
Under general equilibrium theory prices are determined through market pricing by supply and demand. Here asset prices jointly satisfy the requirement that the quantities of each asset supplied and the quantities demanded must be equal at that price - so called market clearing. These models are born out of modern portfolio theory, with the capital asset pricing model (CAPM) as the prototypical result. Prices here are determined with reference to macroeconomic variables–for the CAPM, the "overall market"; for the CCAPM, overall wealth– such that individual preferences are subsumed.

These models aim at modeling the statistically derived probability distribution of the market prices of "all" securities at a given future investment horizon; they are thus of "large dimension". See § Risk and portfolio management: the P world under Mathematical finance. General equilibrium pricing is then used when evaluating diverse portfolios, creating one asset price for many assets.

Calculating an investment or share value here, entails: (i) a financial forecast for the business or project in question; (ii) where the output cashflows are then discounted at the rate returned by the model selected; this rate in turn reflecting the "riskiness" - i.e. the idiosyncratic, or undiversifiable risk - of these cashflows; (iii) these present values are then aggregated, returning the value in question. See: Financial modeling § Accounting, and Valuation using discounted cash flows. (Note that an alternate, although less common approach, is to apply a "fundamental valuation" method, such as the T-model, which instead relies on accounting information, attempting to model return based on the company's expected financial performance.)

== Rational pricing ==
Under Rational pricing, derivative prices are calculated such that they are arbitrage-free with respect to more fundamental (equilibrium determined) securities prices; for an overview of the logic, see Derivative (finance) § Determining the arbitrage-free price.

In general this approach does not group assets but rather creates a unique risk price for each asset; these models are then of "low dimension". For further discussion, see § Derivatives pricing: the Q world under Mathematical finance.

Calculating option prices, and their "Greeks", i.e. sensitivities, combines: (i) a model of the underlying price behavior, or "process" - i.e. the asset pricing model selected, with its parameters having been calibrated to observed prices; and (ii) a mathematical method which returns the premium (or sensitivity) as the expected value of option payoffs over the range of prices of the underlying. See Valuation of options § Pricing models.

The classical model here is Black–Scholes which describes the dynamics of a market including derivatives (with its option pricing formula); leading more generally to martingale pricing, as well as the above listed models. Black–Scholes assumes a log-normal process; the other models will, for example, incorporate features such as mean reversion, or will be "volatility surface aware", applying local volatility or stochastic volatility.

Rational pricing is also applied to fixed income instruments such as bonds (that consist of just one asset), as well as to interest rate modeling in general, where yield curves must be arbitrage free with respect to the prices of individual instruments. See Rational pricing § Fixed-income securities, as well as Bootstrapping (finance) and Multi-curve framework. For discussion as to how the models listed above are applied to options on these instruments, and other interest rate derivatives, see short-rate model and Heath–Jarrow–Morton framework.

== Interrelationship ==
These principles are interrelated through the fundamental theorem of asset pricing. Here, "in the absence of arbitrage, the market imposes a probability distribution, called a risk-neutral or equilibrium measure, on the set of possible market scenarios, and... this probability measure determines market prices via discounted expectation". Correspondingly, this essentially means that one may make financial decisions using the risk neutral probability distribution consistent with (i.e. solved for) observed equilibrium prices. See Financial economics § Arbitrage-free pricing and equilibrium.

Relatedly, both approaches are consistent with what is called the Arrow–Debreu theory. Here models can be derived as a function of "state prices" - contracts that pay one unit of a numeraire (a currency or a commodity) if a particular state occurs at a particular time, and zero otherwise. The approach taken is to recognize that since the price of a security can be returned as a linear combination of its state prices (contingent claim analysis) so, conversely, pricing- or return-models can be backed-out, given state prices. The CAPM, for example, can be derived by linking risk aversion to overall market return, and restating for price. Black-Scholes can be derived by attaching a binomial probability to each of numerous possible spot-prices (i.e. states) and then rearranging for the terms in its formula. See Financial economics § Uncertainty.

== See also ==
- List of financial economics articles
- Outline of finance § Asset pricing theory
- Outline of finance § Portfolio theory
