= Lattice model (finance) =

Method for evaluating stock options that divides time into discrete intervals

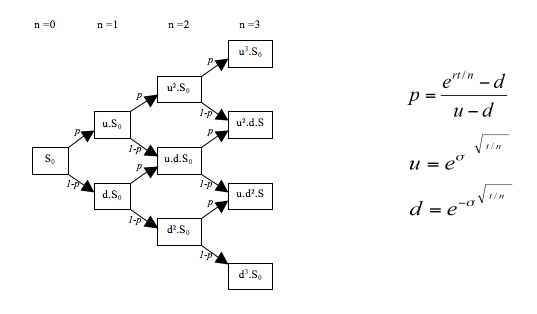
Binomial Lattice for equity, with CRR formulae

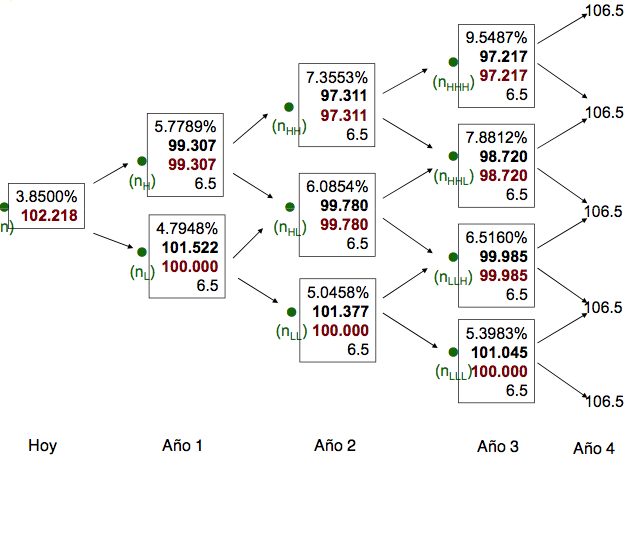
Tree for an (embedded) bond option returning the OAS (black vs red): the short rate is the top value; the development of the bond value shows pull-to-par clearly

In quantitative finance, a lattice model is a numerical approach to the valuation of derivatives in situations requiring a discrete time model. For dividend paying equity options, a typical application would correspond to the pricing of an American-style option, where a decision to exercise is allowed at the closing of any calendar day up to the maturity. A continuous model, on the other hand, such as the standard Black–Scholes one, would only allow for the valuation of European options, where exercise is limited to the option's maturity date. For interest rate derivatives lattices are additionally useful in that they address many of the issues encountered with continuous models, such as pull to par. The method is also used for valuing certain exotic options, because of path dependence in the payoff. Traditional Monte Carlo methods for option pricing fail to account for optimal decisions to terminate the derivative by early exercise, but some methods now exist for solving this problem.

== Equity and commodity derivatives ==
Tree-based equity option valuation:

1. Construct the tree of equity-prices:

- Either forward-construct, applying an up or down factor ($u$ or $d$) to the current price, such that in the next period the price will either be $S_{up} = S \cdot u$ or $S_{down} = S \cdot d$;
- or given that the tree is recombining, directly via $S_n = S_0 \times u ^{N_u - N_d}$, where $N_u$ is the number of up ticks and $N_d$ is the number of down ticks.

2. Construct the corresponding option tree:

- at each final node of the tree—i.e. at expiration of the option—the option value is simply its intrinsic, or exercise, value;
- at earlier nodes, value is via expectation, $C_{t-\Delta t,i} = e^{-r \Delta t}(pC_{t,i+1} + (1-p)C_{t,i-1}) \,$, $p$ being the probability of an up move; where non-European value is the greater of this and the exercise value given the corresponding equity value.

In general the approach is to divide time between now and the option's expiration into N discrete periods. At the specific time n, the model has a finite number of outcomes at time n + 1 such that every possible change in the state of the world between n and n + 1 is captured in a branch. This process is iterated until every possible path between n = 0 and n = N is mapped. Probabilities are then estimated for every n to n + 1 path. The outcomes and probabilities flow backwards through the tree until a fair value of the option today is calculated.

=== Variants ===
For European equity- and commodity options the application is as follows. The first step is to trace the evolution of the option's key underlying variable(s), starting with today's spot price, such that this process is consistent with its volatility; log-normal Brownian motion with constant volatility is usually assumed. The next step is to value the option recursively: stepping backwards from the final time-step, where we have exercise value at each node; and applying risk neutral valuation at each earlier node, where option value is the probability-weighted present value of the up- and down-nodes in the later time-step. See Binomial options pricing model § Method for more detail, as well as Rational pricing § Risk neutral valuation for logic and formulae derivation.

As stated above, the lattice approach is particularly useful in valuing American options, where the choice whether to exercise the option early, or to hold the option, may be modeled at each discrete time/price combination; this is also true for Bermudan options. For similar reasons, real options and employee stock options are often modeled using a lattice framework, though with modified assumptions. In each of these cases, a third step is to determine whether the option is to be exercised or held, and to then apply this value at the node in question. Some exotic options, such as barrier options, are also easily modeled here; for other Path-Dependent Options, simulation would be preferred. (Although, tree-based methods have been developed. )

The simplest lattice model is the binomial options pricing model; the standard ("canonical") method is that proposed by Cox, Ross and Rubinstein (CRR) in 1979; see diagram for formulae. Over 20 other methods have been developed, with each "derived under a variety of assumptions" as regards the development of the underlying's price. In the limit, as the number of time-steps increases, these converge to the Log-normal distribution, and hence produce the "same" option price as Black-Scholes: to achieve this, these will variously seek to agree with the underlying's central moments, raw moments and / or log-moments at each time-step, as measured discretely. Further enhancements are designed to achieve stability relative to Black-Scholes as the number of time-steps changes. More recent models, in fact, are designed around direct convergence to Black-Scholes.

A variant on the Binomial, is the Trinomial tree, developed by Phelim Boyle in 1986. Here, the share price may remain unchanged over the time-step, and option valuation is then based on the value of the share at the up-, down- and middle-nodes in the later time-step. As for the binomial, a similar (although smaller) range of methods exist. The trinomial model is considered to produce more accurate results than the binomial model when fewer time steps are modelled, and is therefore used when computational speed or resources may be an issue. For vanilla options, as the number of steps increases, the results rapidly converge, and the binomial model is then preferred due to its simpler implementation. For exotic options the trinomial model (or adaptations) is sometimes more stable and accurate, regardless of step-size.

For multiple underlyers – e.g. Rainbow- and Basket options – "multinomial lattices" can be built. Each underlyer will have its own tree, and the per node option-value will be a function of the corresponding nodes on all underlying trees. In the case of two assets, the tree will then be referred to as a "binomial pyramid". Two additional complications exist here. First, the number of nodes increases exponentially with the number of underlyers. Second, in these products, correlations between assets play a significant role, and these must also inhere in the modelling.

=== Risk measurement and management ===
Various of the Greeks can be estimated directly on the lattice, where the sensitivities are calculated using finite differences. Delta and gamma, being sensitivities of option value w.r.t. price, are approximated given differences between option prices – with their related spot – in the same time step. Theta, sensitivity to time, is likewise estimated given the option price at the first node in the tree and the option price for the same spot in a later time step. (Second time step for trinomial, third for binomial. Depending on method, if the "down factor" is not the inverse of the "up factor", this method will not be precise.) For rho, sensitivity to interest rates, and vega, sensitivity to input volatility, the measurement is indirect, as the value must be calculated a second time on a new lattice built with these inputs slightly altered – and the sensitivity here is likewise returned via finite difference. See also Fugit, the estimated time to exercise for a non-European option, which is typically calculated using a lattice.

Beginning with the 1987 crash, and especially since the 2008 financial crisis, it has become important to incorporate the volatility smile / surface into pricing models. This recognizes the fact that the underlying price-change distribution displays a term structure and is non-normal, unlike that assumed by Black-Scholes; see Financial economics § Derivative pricing and Valuation of options § Post crisis. To do so, banks typically apply stochastic- or local volatility models. In the Lattice framework, implied trees can be constructed; these essentially discretize the latter. Here, the tree is solved such that it successfully reproduces selected (all) market prices, across various strikes and expirations. These trees thus "ensure that all European standard options (with strikes and maturities coinciding with the tree nodes) will have theoretical values which match their market prices". Using the calibrated lattice one can then price options with strike / maturity combinations not quoted in the market, such that these prices are consistent with observed volatility patterns. For risk management, the Greeks returned here will reflect sensitivities more appropriately.

There exist both implied binomial trees, often Rubinstein IBTs (R-IBT), and implied trinomial trees, often Derman-Kani-Chriss (DKC; superseding the DK-IBT). The former is easier built, but is consistent with one maturity only; the latter will be consistent with, but at the same time requires, known (or interpolated) prices at all time-steps and nodes. As regards the construction, for an R-IBT the first step is to recover the "Implied Ending Risk-Neutral Probabilities" of spot prices. Then by the assumption that all paths which lead to the same ending node have the same risk-neutral probability, a "path probability" is attached to each ending node. Thereafter "it's as simple as One-Two-Three", and a three step backwards recursion allows for the node probabilities to be recovered for each time step. Option valuation then proceeds as standard, with these probabilities replacing $p$ above. For DKC, the first step is to recover the state prices corresponding to each node in the tree, such that these are consistent with observed option prices (i.e. with the volatility surface). Thereafter the up-, down- and middle-probabilities are found for each node such that: these sum to 1; spot prices adjacent time-step-wise evolve risk neutrally, incorporating dividend yield; state prices similarly "grow" at the risk free rate. (The solution here is iterative per time step as opposed to simultaneous.) As for R-IBTs, option valuation is then by standard backward recursion.

As an alternative, Edgeworth binomial trees may be employed, as these allow for an analyst-specified skew and kurtosis in spot-price returns (see Edgeworth series). Here, options with differing strikes will return differing implied volatilities, and the tree may then be calibrated to the volatility smile, by a "judicious choice" of parameter values. For pricing American options, the valuation will be on an R-IBT as combined with the calibrated maturity distribution. The Edgeworth approach is limited as to the set of skewness and kurtosis pairs for which valid distributions are available: the more recent Johnson binomial trees, then, use the Johnson "family" of distributions, as this is capable of accommodating all possible pairs. Edgeworth (or Johnson) trees are also useful for other applications where the underlying's behavior departs (markedly) from normal. As an example, these trees can be applied to multinomial options: Basket options, for instance, can be priced using an "approximating distribution" which provides the end-nodes, and skew and kurtosis, on which the tree is then built.

Re the modelling of CVA / XVA via lattice, see below.

== Interest rate derivatives ==
Tree-based bond option valuation:

0. Construct an interest-rate tree, which, as described in the text, will be consistent with the current term structure of interest rates.

1. Construct a corresponding tree of bond-prices, where the underlying bond is valued at each node by "backwards induction":

- at its final nodes, bond value is simply face value (or $1), plus coupon (in cents) if relevant; if the bond-date and tree-date do not coincide, these are then discounted to the start of the time-step using the node-specific short-rate;
- at each earlier node, it is the discounted expected value of nodes in the later time step, using $p_u$ and $p_d$ from the model, plus coupon payments during the current time step, similarly discounted to the start of the time-step.

2. Construct a corresponding bond-option tree, where the option on the bond is valued largely as for an equity option:

- at option maturity, value is based on moneyness for all nodes in that time-step;
- at earlier nodes, value is a function of the expected value of the option at the nodes in the later time step, discounted at the short-rate of the current node; where non-European value is the greater of this and the exercise value given the corresponding bond value.

Lattices are commonly used in valuing bond options, swaptions, and other interest rate derivatives In these cases the valuation is largely as above, but requires an additional, zeroeth, step of constructing an interest rate tree, on which the price of the underlying is then based. The next step also differs: the underlying price here is built via "backward induction" i.e. flows backwards from maturity, accumulating the present value of scheduled cash flows at each node, as opposed to flowing forwards from valuation date as above. The final step, option valuation, then proceeds as standard. See top for graphic, and aside for description.

=== Approaches ===
The initial lattice is built by discretizing either a short-rate model, such as Hull–White or Black Derman Toy, or a forward rate-based model, such as the LIBOR market model or HJM. As for equity, trinomial trees may also be employed for these models; this is usually the case for Hull-White trees.

Under HJM, the condition of no arbitrage implies that there exists a martingale probability measure, as well as a corresponding restriction on the "drift coefficients" of the forward rates. These, in turn, are functions of the volatility(s) of the forward rates. A "simple" discretized expression for the drift then allows for forward rates to be expressed in a binomial lattice. For these forward rate-based models, dependent on volatility assumptions, the lattice might not recombine. (This means that an "up-move" followed by a "down-move" will not give the same result as a "down-move" followed by an "up-move".) In this case, the Lattice is sometimes referred to as a "bush", and the number of nodes grows exponentially as a function of number of time-steps. A recombining binomial tree methodology is also available for the Libor Market Model.

As regards the short-rate models, these are, in turn, further categorized: these will be either equilibrium-based (Vasicek and CIR) or arbitrage-free (Ho–Lee and subsequent). This distinction: for equilibrium-based models the yield curve is an output from the model, while for arbitrage-free models the yield curve is an input to the model. In the former case, the approach is to "calibrate" the model parameters, such that bond prices produced by the model, in its continuous form, best fit observed market prices. The tree is then built as a function of these parameters. In the latter case, the calibration is directly on the lattice: the fit is to both the current term structure of interest rates (i.e. the yield curve), and the corresponding volatility structure. Here, calibration means that the interest-rate-tree reproduces the prices of the zero-coupon bonds—and any other interest-rate sensitive securities—used in constructing the yield curve; note the parallel to the implied trees for equity above, and compare Bootstrapping (finance). For models assuming a normal distribution (such as Ho-Lee), calibration may be performed analytically, while for log-normal models the calibration is via a root-finding algorithm; see for example, the boxed-description under Black–Derman–Toy model.

The volatility structure—i.e. vertical node-spacing—here reflects the volatility of rates during the quarter, or other period, corresponding to the lattice time-step. (Some analysts use "realized volatility", i.e. of the rates applicable historically for the time-step; to be market-consistent, analysts generally prefer to use current interest rate cap prices, and the implied volatility for the Black-76-prices of each component caplet; see Interest rate cap § Implied Volatilities.) Given this functional link to volatility, note now the resultant difference in the construction relative to equity implied trees: for interest rates, the volatility is known for each time-step, and the node-values (i.e. interest rates) must be solved for specified risk neutral probabilities; for equity, on the other hand, a single volatility cannot be specified per time-step, i.e. we have a "smile", and the tree is built by solving for the probabilities corresponding to specified values of the underlying at each node.

Once calibrated, the interest rate lattice is then used in the valuation of various of the fixed income instruments and derivatives. The approach for bond options is described aside—note that this approach addresses the problem of pull to par experienced under closed form approaches; see Black–Scholes model § Valuing bond options. For swaptions the logic is almost identical, substituting swaps for bonds in step 1, and swaptions for bond options in step 2. For caps (and floors) step 1 and 2 are combined: at each node the value is based on the relevant nodes at the later step, plus, for any caplet (floorlet) maturing in the time-step, the difference between its reference-rate and the short-rate at the node (and reflecting the corresponding day count fraction and notional-value exchanged). For callable- and putable bonds a third step would be required: at each node in the time-step incorporate the effect of the embedded option on the bond price and / or the option price there before stepping-backwards one time-step. (And noting that these options are not mutually exclusive, and so a bond may have several options embedded; hybrid securities are treated below.) For other, more exotic interest rate derivatives, similar adjustments are made to steps 1 and onward. For the "Greeks", largely as for equity, see under next section.

An alternative approach to modeling (American) bond options, particularly those struck on yield to maturity (YTM), employs modified equity-lattice methods. Here the analyst builds a CRR tree of YTM, applying a constant volatility assumption, and then calculates the bond price as a function of this yield at each node; prices here are thus pulling-to-par. The second step is to then incorporate any term structure of volatility by building a corresponding DKC tree (based on every second time-step in the CRR tree: as DKC is trinomial whereas CRR is binomial) and then using this for option valuation.

=== Post-crisis ===
Since the 2008 financial crisis, swap pricing is (generally) under a "multi-curve framework", whereas previously it was off a single, "self discounting", curve; see Interest rate swap § Valuation and pricing. Here, payoffs are set as a function of the Reference rate or forecast rate (LIBOR) specific to the tenor in question, while discounting is at the OIS rate. To accommodate this in the lattice framework, the OIS rate and the relevant reference rate are jointly modeled in a three-dimensional tree, constructed so as to return the input OIS- and Libor-swap prices, while also inhering any correlation between the two rate sets. With the zeroeth step thus accomplished, the valuation will proceed largely as previously, using steps 1 and onwards, but here – similar to the above "pyramid" – with cashflows based on the LIBOR tree, and discounting using the corresponding nodes from the OIS tree.

A related development is that banks will make a credit valuation adjustment, CVA – as well as various of the other XVA – when assessing the value of derivative contracts that they have entered into. The purpose of these is twofold: primarily to hedge for possible losses due to the other parties' failures to pay amounts due on the derivative contracts; but also to determine (and hedge) the amount of capital required under the bank capital adequacy rules. Although usually calculated under a simulation framework, tree-based methods can be applied here also. In the case of a swap, for example, the potential future exposure, PFE, facing the bank on each date is the probability-weighted average of the positive settlement payments and swap values over the lattice-nodes at the date; each node's probability is in turn a function of the tree's cumulative up- and down-probabilities. This PFE is combined with the counterparty's (tree-exogenous) probability of default and recovery rate to derive the expected loss for the date. Finally, the aggregated present value of these is the CVA for the counterparty on that position.

== Hybrid securities ==
Hybrid securities, incorporating both equity- and bond-like features are also valued using trees. For convertible bonds (CBs) the approach of Tsiveriotis and Fernandes (1998) is to divide the value of the bond at each node into an "equity" component, arising from situations where the CB will be converted, and a "debt" component, arising from situations where CB is redeemed. Correspondingly, twin trees are constructed where discounting is at the risk free and credit risk adjusted rate respectively, with the sum being the value of the CB. There are other methods, which similarly combine an equity-type tree with a short-rate tree. An alternate approach, originally published by Goldman Sachs (1994), does not decouple the components, rather, discounting is at a conversion-probability-weighted risk-free and risky interest rate within a single tree. See Convertible bond § Valuation, Contingent convertible bond.

More generally, equity can be viewed as a call option on the firm: where the value of the firm is less than the value of the outstanding debt shareholders would choose not to repay the firm's debt; they would choose to repay—and not to liquidate (i.e. exercise their option)—otherwise. Lattice models have been developed for equity analysis here, particularly as relates to distressed firms. Relatedly, as regards corporate debt pricing, the relationship between equity holders' limited liability and potential Chapter 11 proceedings has also been modelled via lattice.

The calculation of "Greeks" for interest rate derivatives proceeds as for equity. There is however an additional requirement, particularly for hybrid securities: that is, to estimate sensitivities related to overall changes in interest rates. For a bond with an embedded option, the standard yield to maturity based calculations of duration and convexity do not consider how changes in interest rates will alter the cash flows due to option exercise. To address this, effective duration and -convexity are introduced. Here, similar to rho and vega above, the interest rate tree is rebuilt for an upward and then downward parallel shift in the yield curve and these measures are calculated numerically given the corresponding changes in bond value.

== Bibliography ==
- David F. Babbel (1996). Valuation of Interest-Sensitive Financial Instruments (1st ed.). John Wiley & Sons. ISBN 978-1883249151.
- Gerald Buetow; Frank Fabozzi (2000). Valuation of Interest Rate Swaps and Swaptions. John Wiley. ISBN 978-1883249892.
- Gerald Buetow & James Sochacki (2001). Term-Structure Models Using Binomial Trees. The Research Foundation of AIMR (CFA Institute). ISBN 978-0-943205-53-3.
- Les Clewlow; Chris Strickland (1998). Implementing Derivative Models. New Jersey: Wiley. ISBN 978-0-471-96651-7.
- Rama Cont, ed. (2010). Tree methods in finance, Encyclopedia of Quantitative Finance (PDF). Wiley. ISBN 978-0-470-05756-8.
- Frank Fabozzi (1998). Valuation of fixed income securities and derivatives (3rd ed.). John Wiley. ISBN 978-1-883249-25-0.
- Espen Haug (2006). The Complete Guide to Option Pricing Formulas. New York: McGraw-Hill. ISBN 978-0-07-138997-6.
- Richard Rendleman (2002). Applied Derivatives: Options, Futures, and Swaps (1st ed.). Wiley-Blackwell. ISBN 978-0-631-21590-5.
- Mark Rubinstein (2000). Rubinstein On Derivatives (1st ed.). Risk Books. ISBN 978-1899332533.
- Steven Shreve (2004). Stochastic Calculus for Finance I: The Binomial Asset Pricing Model. Springer. ISBN 978-0387249681.
- Donald J. Smith (2017). Valuation in a World of CVA, DVA, and FVA: A Tutorial on Debt Securities and Interest Rate Derivatives. World Scientific. ISBN 978-9813222748.
- John van der Hoek & Robert J. Elliott (2006). Binomial Models in Finance. Springer. ISBN 978-0-387-25898-0.
