= Finite difference methods for option pricing =

Numerical method in mathematical finance

The Black–Scholes partial differential equation and its Crank–Nicolson finite-difference discretisation.

Black–Scholes equation:
$\frac{\partial f}{\partial t} +\frac{1}{2}\sigma^2S^2\frac{\partial^2 f}{\partial S^2} +rS\frac{\partial f}{\partial S} =rf$

Crank–Nicolson discretisation:

$\begin{array}{l} \frac{f_{i,j}-f_{i,j-1}}{\Delta t} \\[6pt] +\frac{1}{2}\sigma^2S_i^2 \frac{ \left(\frac{f_{i+1,j}-2f_{i,j}+f_{i-1,j}}{\Delta S^2}\right) + \left(\frac{f_{i+1,j-1}-2f_{i,j-1}+f_{i-1,j-1}}{\Delta S^2}\right) }{2} \\[6pt] +rS_i \frac{ \left(\frac{f_{i+1,j}-f_{i-1,j}}{2\Delta S}\right) + \left(\frac{f_{i+1,j-1}-f_{i-1,j-1}}{2\Delta S}\right) }{2} \\[6pt] =r\frac{f_{i,j}+f_{i,j-1}}{2} \end{array}$

Finite difference methods for option pricing are numerical methods used in mathematical finance for the valuation of options, where the differential equation that describes how an option price evolves over time is represented by a set of difference equations. They can be used to solve derivative pricing problems that have, in general, the same level of complexity as those problems solved by tree approaches, although are more readily applied to non-standard options. The method was first developed by Eduardo Schwartz in 1977.

== Method ==
Crank–Nicolson stencil for above formulae. Starting from the known terminal payoff at maturity (${_j}={_N}$), the scheme is solved recursively backwards in time: at each time step $_{j-1}$ the unknown values $_{i}$ form a tridiagonal linear system, which may be solved efficiently using the Thomas algorithm, or other methods.

As outlined, finite difference methods are used to price options by approximating the (continuous-time) differential equation that describes how an option price evolves over time — typically the Black–Scholes PDE, see aside — by a set of (discrete-time) difference equations. The discrete difference equations may then be solved iteratively to calculate a price for the option.

Here, a lattice is constructed (minimally) with dimensions time ${j}$, which runs from 0 to maturity (${N}$ steps), and price ${i}$, which runs from 0 to a "high" value, such that the option is deeply in or out of the money; see aside. The option is then valued as follows:

1. Maturity values are simply the difference between the exercise price of the option and the value of the underlying at each point (for a call, e.g., $C(S, T) =max\{S - K, 0\}$).
2. Values at the boundaries – i.e. at each earlier time where spot is at its highest or zero – are set based on moneyness or arbitrage bounds on option prices (for a call, $C(0, t) = 0$ for all t and $C(S, t) = S - K e^{-r(T-t)}$ as $S \rightarrow \infty$).
3. Values at other lattice points are calculated recursively (iteratively), starting at the time step preceding maturity and ending at time=0. Here, see boxed description, using a technique such as Crank–Nicolson or the explicit method:

- the PDE is discretized per the technique chosen, such that the value at each lattice point is specified as a function of the value at later and adjacent points;
- the value at each point is then found using the technique in question; working backwards in time from maturity, and inwards from the boundary prices.

4. The value of the option today, where the underlying is at its spot price, (or at any time/price combination,) is then found by interpolation.

== Application ==
As above, finite difference methods can solve derivative pricing problems that have, in general, the same level of complexity as those problems solved by tree approaches. In fact, when standard assumptions are applied, the explicit technique encompasses the binomial- and trinomial tree methods. and tree based methods are then a special case of the explicit finite difference method.

At the same time, these methods can accommodate fairly complex settings more readily than trees, and it is here where they are typically employed. Their grid-structure allows for term-structured interest rates, smile-linked implied volatility, and time- or share price linked dividend policy. It also allows for state-specific decision rules when pricing, e.g., employee stock options or real options.

Regardless, as for tree-based methods, the approach is limited in terms of the number of underlying variables, and for problems with multiple dimensions, Monte Carlo methods for option pricing are usually preferred.
