= Francis Longstaff =

American economist

Francis A. Longstaff (born August 3, 1956) is an American educator and pioneer in quantitative finance. He serves as the Allstate Professor of Insurance and Finance at the Anderson School of Management, University of California, Los Angeles, and the former Finance Area Chair.

His research focuses on fixed income markets, term structure, derivatives, credit risk, computational finance and the role of arbitrage in financial markets. He is known for the Longstaff–Schwartz model a multi-factor short-rate model, and the Longstaff-Schwartz method for valuing American options by Monte Carlo Simulation. He has published over 50 research and practitioner articles, and is a recipient of the Michael Brennan Award.

Longstaff was head of Fixed Income Derivative Research at Salomon Brothers from 1995 to 1998, and worked in the research department of the Chicago Board of Trade and for Deloitte and Touche as a management consultant. He is a research associate in the National Bureau of Economic Research Asset Pricing Program.

Longstaff earned his Ph.D. in finance from the Graduate School of Business at the University of Chicago, in 1987. He received a BA finance (1979, magna cum laude), BA accounting (1982, first in class), and MBA (1980, first in class), all from the University of Utah. He is also a Certified Public Accountant (CPA) and holds the Chartered Financial Analyst (CFA) designation.
