= Black–Derman–Toy model =

Short-rate model in mathematical finance

Short-rate tree calibration under BDT:

Step 0. Set the risk-neutral probability of an up move, $p$, to 50%
Step 1. For each input spot rate, iteratively:

- adjust the rate at the top-most node at the current time-step, $i$;
- find all other rates in the time-step, where these are linked to the node immediately above ($r_u$; $r_d$ being the node in question) via $\ln(r_u/r_d)/2=\sigma_i\sqrt{\Delta t}$ (this node-spacing being consistent with $p$ = 50%; Δt being the length of the time-step);
- discount recursively through the tree using the rate at each node, i.e. via "backwards induction", from the time-step in question to the first node in the tree (i.e. $i$=0);
- repeat until the discounted value at the first node in the tree equals the zero-price corresponding to the given spot interest rate for the i-th time-step.

Step 2. Once solved, retain these known short rates, and proceed to the next time-step (i.e. input spot-rate), "growing" the tree until it incorporates the full input yield-curve.

In mathematical finance, the Black–Derman–Toy model (BDT) is a popular short-rate model used in the pricing of bond options, swaptions and other interest rate derivatives; see Lattice model (finance) § Interest rate derivatives. It is a one-factor model; that is, a single stochastic factor—the short rate—determines the future evolution of all interest rates. It was the first model to combine the mean-reverting behaviour of the short rate with the log-normal distribution, and is still widely used.

== History ==
The model was introduced by Fischer Black, Emanuel Derman, and William (Bill) Toy. It was first developed for in-house use by Goldman Sachs in the 1980s and was published in the Financial Analysts Journal in 1990. A personal account of the development of the model is provided in Emanuel Derman's memoir My Life as a Quant.

== Formulae ==
Under BDT, using a binomial lattice, one calibrates the model parameters to fit both the current term structure of interest rates (yield curve), and the volatility structure for interest rate caps (usually as implied by the Black-76-prices for each component caplet); see aside. Using the calibrated lattice one can then value a variety of more complex interest-rate sensitive securities and interest rate derivatives.

Although initially developed for a lattice-based environment, the model has been shown to imply the following continuous stochastic differential equation:

$$d\ln(r) = \left[\theta_t + \frac{\sigma'_t}{\sigma_t}\ln(r)\right]dt + \sigma_t\, dW_t$$

where,
$r\,$ = the instantaneous short rate at time t
$\theta_t\,$ = value of the underlying asset at option expiry
$\sigma_t\,$ = instant short rate volatility
$W_t\,$ = a standard Brownian motion under a risk-neutral probability measure; $dW_t\,$ its differential.

For constant (time independent) short rate volatility, $\sigma\,$, the model is:

$$d\ln(r) = \theta_t\, dt + \sigma \, dW_t$$

One reason that the model remains popular, is that the "standard" Root-finding algorithms—such as Newton's method (the secant method) or bisection—are very easily applied to the calibration. Relatedly, the model was originally described in algorithmic language, and not using stochastic calculus or martingales.
