= Monte Carlo methods for option pricing =

Model in mathematical finance

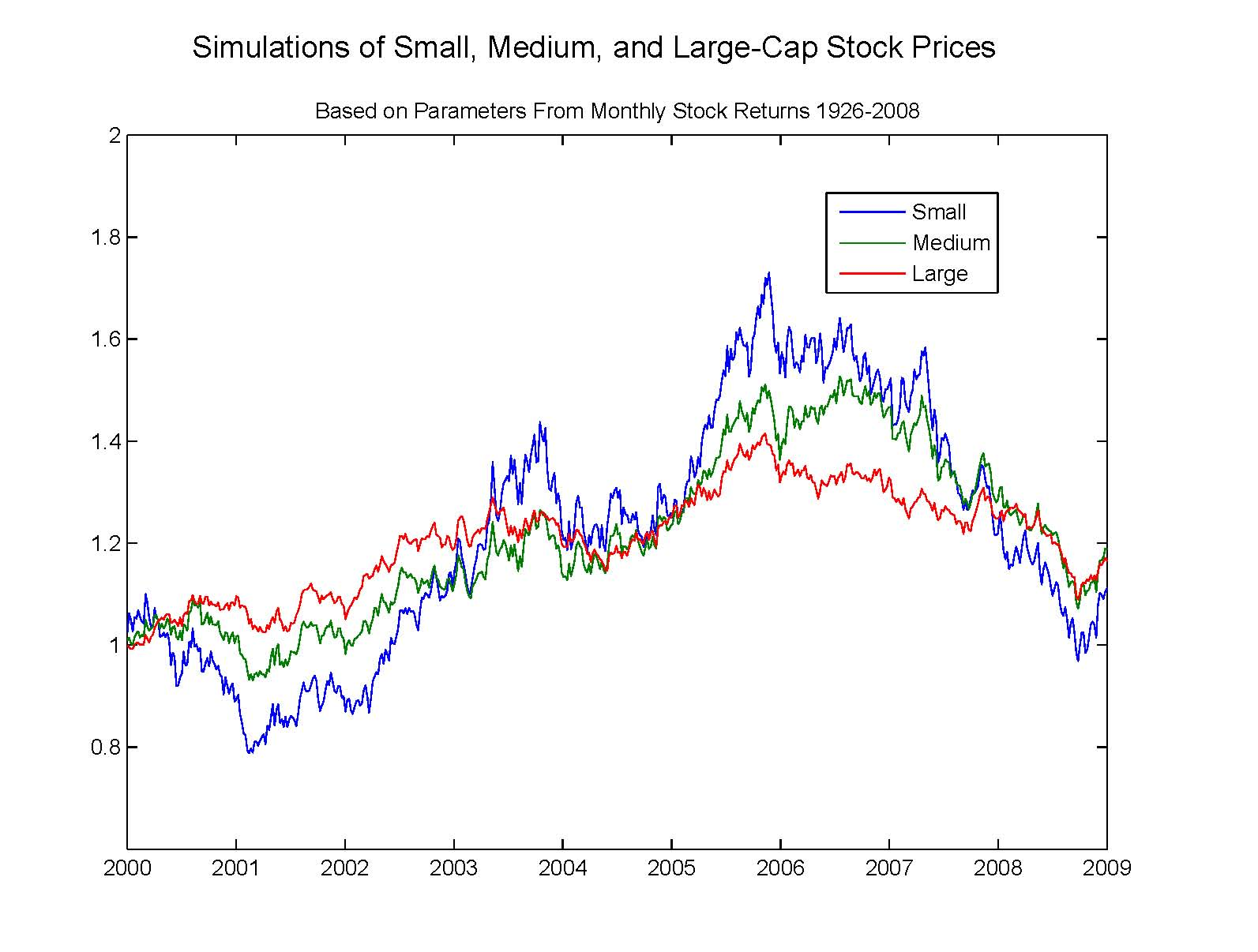
Simulated geometric Brownian motions with parameters from market data

In mathematical finance, a Monte Carlo option model uses Monte Carlo methods (Note: Although the term 'Monte Carlo method' was coined by Stanislaw Ulam in the 1940s, some trace such methods to the 18th century French naturalist Buffon, and a question he asked about the results of dropping a needle randomly on a striped floor or table. See Buffon's needle.) to calculate the value of an option with multiple sources of uncertainty or with complicated features. The first application to option pricing was by Phelim Boyle in 1977 (for European options). In 1996, M. Broadie and P. Glasserman showed how to price Asian options by Monte Carlo. An important development was the introduction in 1996 by Carriere of Monte Carlo methods for options with early exercise features.

== Methodology ==
As is standard, Monte Carlo valuation relies on risk neutral valuation. Here the price of the option is its discounted expected value; see risk neutrality and rational pricing. The technique applied then, is (1) to generate a large number of possible, but random, price paths for the underlying (or underlyings) via simulation, and (2) to then calculate the associated exercise value (i.e. "payoff") of the option for each path. (3) These payoffs are then averaged and (4) discounted to today. This result is the value of the option.

This approach, although relatively straightforward, allows for increasing complexity:

- An option on equity may be modelled with one source of uncertainty: the price of the underlying stock in question. Here the price of the underlying instrument $\ S_t \,$ is usually modelled such that it follows a geometric Brownian motion with constant drift $\mu \,$ and volatility $\sigma \,$. So: $dS_t = \mu S_t\,dt + \sigma S_t\,dW_t \,$, where $dW_t \,$ is found via a random sampling from a normal distribution; see further under Black–Scholes. Since the underlying random process is the same, for enough price paths, the value of a european option here should be the same as under Black–Scholes. More generally though, simulation is employed for path dependent exotic derivatives, such as Asian options.
- In other cases, the source of uncertainty may be at a remove. For example, for bond options the underlying is a bond, but the source of uncertainty is the annualized interest rate (i.e. the short rate). Here, for each randomly generated yield curve we observe a different resultant bond price on the option's exercise date; this bond price is then the input for the determination of the option's payoff. The same approach is used in valuing swaptions, where the value of the underlying swap is also a function of the evolving interest rate. (Whereas these options are more commonly valued using lattice based models, as above, for path dependent interest rate derivatives – such as CMOs – simulation is the primary technique employed.) For the models used to simulate the interest-rate see further under Short-rate model; "to create realistic interest rate simulations" Multi-factor short-rate models are sometimes employed. To apply simulation here, the analyst must first "calibrate" the model parameters, such that bond prices produced by the model best fit observed market prices.
- Monte Carlo Methods allow for a compounding in the uncertainty. For example, where the underlying is denominated in a foreign currency, an additional source of uncertainty will be the exchange rate: the underlying price and the exchange rate must be separately simulated and then combined to determine the value of the underlying in the local currency. In all such models, correlation between the underlying sources of risk is also incorporated; see Cholesky decomposition § Monte Carlo simulation. Further complications, such as the impact of commodity prices or inflation on the underlying, can also be introduced. Since simulation can accommodate complex problems of this sort, it is often used in analysing real options where management's decision at any point is a function of multiple underlying variables.
- Simulation can similarly be used to value options where the payoff depends on the value of multiple underlying assets such as a Basket option or Rainbow option. Here, correlation between asset returns is likewise incorporated.
- As required, Monte Carlo simulation can be used with any type of probability distribution, including changing distributions: the modeller is not limited to normal or log-normal returns; see for example Datar–Mathews method for real option valuation. Additionally, the stochastic process of the underlying(s) may be specified so as to exhibit jumps or mean reversion or both; this feature makes simulation the primary valuation method applicable to energy derivatives. Further, some models even allow for (randomly) varying statistical (and other) parameters of the sources of uncertainty. For example, in models incorporating stochastic volatility, the volatility of the underlying changes with time; see Heston model.

== Least Square Monte Carlo ==
Least Square Monte Carlo is a technique for valuing early-exercise options (i.e. Bermudan or American options). It was first introduced by Jacques Carriere in 1996.

It is based on the iteration of a two step procedure:

- First, a backward induction process is performed in which a value is recursively assigned to every state at every timestep. The value is defined as the least squares regression against market price of the option value at that state and time (-step). Option value for this regression is defined as the value of exercise possibilities (dependent on market price) plus the value of the timestep value which that exercise would result in (defined in the previous step of the process).
- Secondly, when all states are valued for every timestep, the value of the option is calculated by moving through the timesteps and states by making an optimal decision on option exercise at every step on the hand of a price path and the value of the state that would result in. This second step can be done with multiple price paths to add a stochastic effect to the procedure.

== Application ==
As can be seen, Monte Carlo Methods are particularly useful in the valuation of options with multiple sources of uncertainty or with complicated features, which would make them difficult to value through a straightforward Black–Scholes-style or lattice based computation. The technique is thus widely used in valuing path dependent structures like lookback- and Asian options and in real options analysis. Additionally, as above, the modeller is not limited as to the probability distribution assumed.

Conversely, however, if an analytical technique for valuing the option exists—or even a numeric technique, such as a (modified) pricing tree—Monte Carlo methods will usually be too slow to be competitive. They are, in a sense, a method of last resort; see further under Monte Carlo methods in finance. With faster computing capability this computational constraint is less of a concern.

== See also ==
- Monte Carlo methods in finance
- Quasi-Monte Carlo methods in finance
- Stochastic modelling (insurance)
- Stochastic asset model
