= Johnson's SU-distribution =

Family of probability distributions

Johnson's S_{U}
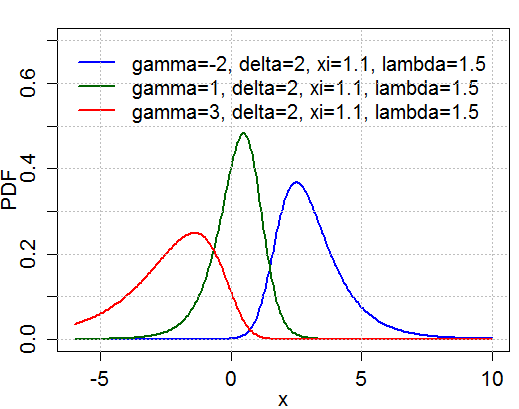
- Probability density function

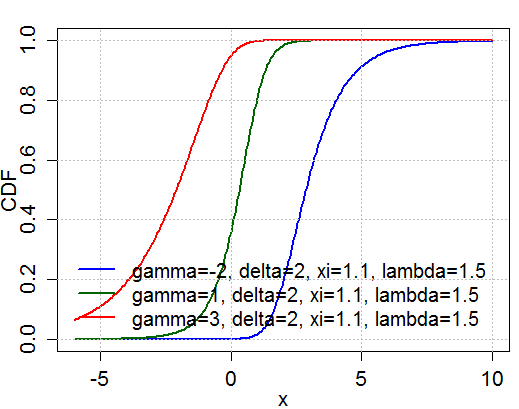
- Cumulative distribution function
- Parameters: $\gamma, \xi, \delta > 0, \lambda > 0$ (real)
- Support: $-\infty \text{ to } +\infty$
- PDF: $\frac{\delta}{\lambda\sqrt{2\pi}} \frac{1}{\sqrt{1 + \left(\frac{x-\xi}{\lambda}\right)^2}} e^{-\frac{1}{2}\left(\gamma+\delta \sinh^{-1} \left(\frac{x-\xi}{\lambda}\right)\right)^2}$
- CDF: $\Phi \left(\gamma + \delta \sinh^{-1} \left( \frac{x-\xi}{\lambda} \right) \right)$
- Mean: $\xi - \lambda \exp \frac{\delta^{-2}}{2} \sinh\left(\frac{\gamma}{\delta}\right)$
- Median: $\xi + \lambda \sinh \left( - \frac{\gamma}{\delta} \right)$
- Variance: $\frac{\lambda^2}{2} (\exp(\delta^{-2})-1) \left( \exp(\delta^{-2}) \cosh \left(\frac{2\gamma}{\delta} \right) +1 \right)$
- Skewness: $-\frac{\lambda^3\sqrt{e^{\delta^{-2}}}(e^{\delta^{-2}}-1)^{2}((e^{\delta^{-2}})(e^{\delta^{-2}}+2)\sinh(\frac{3\gamma}{\delta})+3\sinh(\frac{\gamma}{\delta}))}{4(\operatorname{Variance}X)^{1.5}}$
- Excess kurtosis: $\frac{\lambda^4(e^{\delta^{-2}}-1)^2(K_{1}+K_2+K_3)}{8(\operatorname{Variance}X)^2}$ $K_{1}=\left( e^{\delta^{-2}} \right)^{2}\left( \left( e^{\delta^{-2}} \right)^{4}+2\left( e^{\delta^{-2}} \right)^{3}+3\left( e^{\delta^{-2}} \right)^{2}-3 \right)\cosh\left( \frac{4\gamma}{\delta} \right)$ $K_2=4\left( e^{\delta^{-2}} \right)^2 \left( \left( e^{\delta^{-2}} \right)+2 \right)\cosh\left( \frac{3\gamma}{\delta} \right)$ $K_3=3\left( 2\left( e^{\delta^{-2}} \right)+1 \right)$

The Johnson's S_{U}-distribution is a four-parameter family of probability distributions first investigated by N. L. Johnson in 1949. Johnson proposed it as a transformation of the normal distribution:

$$z=\gamma+\delta \sinh^{-1} \left(\frac{x-\xi}{\lambda}\right)$$

where $z \sim \mathcal{N}(0,1)$.

== Generation of random variables ==
Let U be a random variable that is uniformly distributed on the unit interval [0, 1]. Johnson's S_{U} random variables can be generated from U as follows:

$$x = \lambda \sinh\left( \frac{ \Phi^{ -1 }( U ) - \gamma }{ \delta }  \right) + \xi$$

where Φ is the cumulative distribution function of the normal distribution.

== Johnson's S_{B}-distribution ==
N. L. Johnson firstly proposes the transformation :

$$z=\gamma+\delta \log \left(\frac{x-\xi}{\xi+\lambda-x}\right)$$

where $z \sim \mathcal{N}(0,1)$.

Johnson's S_{B} random variables can be generated from U as follows:

$$y={\left(1+{e}^{-\left(z-\gamma\right) /\delta }\right)}^{-1}$$
$$x=\lambda y +\xi$$

The S_{B}-distribution is convenient to Platykurtic distributions (Kurtosis). To simulate S_{U}, sample of code for its density and cumulative distribution function is available here

== Applications ==
Johnson's $S_{U}$-distribution has been used successfully to model asset returns for portfolio management. This comes as a superior alternative to using the Normal distribution to model asset returns. An R package, JSUparameters, was developed in 2021 to aid in the estimation of the parameters of the best-fitting Johnson's $S_{U}$-distribution for a given dataset. Johnson distributions are also sometimes used in option pricing, so as to accommodate an observed volatility smile; see Johnson binomial tree.

An alternative to the Johnson system of distributions is the quantile-parameterized distributions (QPDs). QPDs can provide greater shape flexibility than the Johnson system. Instead of fitting moments, QPDs are typically fit to empirical CDF data with linear least squares.

Johnson's $S_{U}$-distribution is also used in the modelling of the invariant mass of some heavy mesons in the field of B-physics.
