= Rendleman–Bartter model =

Short-rate model describing the evolution of interest rates

The Rendleman–Bartter model (Richard J. Rendleman, Jr. and Brit J. Bartter) in finance is a short-rate model describing the evolution of interest rates. It is a "one factor model" as it describes interest rate movements as driven by only one source of market risk. As a stochastic asset model, it can be used in the valuation of interest rate derivatives.

The model specifies that the instantaneous interest rate follows a geometric Brownian motion:

$$dr_t = \theta r_t\,dt + \sigma r_t\,dW_t$$

where W_{t} is a Wiener process modelling the random market risk factor. The drift parameter, $\theta$, represents a constant expected instantaneous rate of change in the interest rate, while the standard deviation parameter, $\sigma$, determines the volatility of the interest rate.

This is one of the early models of the short-term interest rates, using the same stochastic process as the one already used to describe the dynamics of the underlying price in stock options. Its main disadvantage is that it does not capture the mean reversion of interest rates (their tendency to revert toward some value or range of values rather than wander without bounds in either direction).

Note that in 1979 Rendleman and Bartter also published an early version of the Binomial options pricing model for equity underlyings.
