= Pull to par =

Pull to Par is the effect in which the price of a bond converges to par value as time passes. At maturity the price of a debt instrument in good standing should equal its par (or face value).

Another name for this effect is reduction of maturity.

It results from the difference between market interest rate and the nominal yield on the bond.

The Pull to Par effect is one of two factors that influence the market value of the bond and its volatility (the second one is the level of market interest rates).

== See also ==
- Black–Scholes model § Valuing bond options
- Bond option § Valuation
