= List of quantitative analysts =

List of notable quantitative analysts

This is a list of notable quantitative analysts (organized by surname). See also: seminal publications in quantitative finance and List of financial economists.

== Pioneers ==
- Kenneth Arrow, (1921–2017), American economist, Social choice theory.
- Louis Bachelier, (1870–1946), French mathematician, Pioneer of financial mathematics.
- Jacob Bernoulli, (1654–1705), Swiss mathematician, discovered the mathematical constant e while studying Compound interest.
- Fischer Black, (1938–1995), American economist, famous for Black–Scholes equation.
- Michael Brennan, (born 1942), co-designed the Brennan-Schwartz interest rate model, and pioneer of real options theory.
- Vinzenz Bronzin (1872–1970), Italian mathematics professor; published option pricing formulae in 1908, as well as a formulation of put–call parity.
- Phelim Boyle, (born 1941), (Irish physicist), initiated the use of Monte Carlo methods and Trinomial trees in option pricing.
- John Carrington Cox, (born 1943), one of the inventors of the Cox-Ross-Rubinstein model.
- Emanuel Derman, (born 1945), particle physicist, co-author of Black–Derman–Toy model.
- Richard A. Epstein, (1927–2016), notable American game theorist and physicist.
- Eugene Fama, (born 1939) American economist, work on portfolio theory and asset pricing, laureate Nobel Memorial Prize in Economic Sciences.
- Victor Glushkov, (1923–1982), founding father of information theory in the Soviet Union.
- Benjamin Graham, (1894–1976) American economist and professional investor and first proponent of value investing.
- Myron J. Gordon, (1920–2010) American economist; noted for Gordon model.
- Robert Haugen, (1942–2013) US financial economist and a pioneer in the field of quantitative investing and low-volatility investing.
- Thomas Ho, author of the Ho–Lee model and key rate duration.
- John C. Hull, noted for the Hull–White model.
- Jonathan E. Ingersoll, (born 1949), one of the authors of the Cox–Ingersoll–Ross model of the yield curve.
- Kiyoshi Itō, (1915–2008) was a Japanese mathematician whose work is now called Itō calculus.
- Robert A. Jarrow, a co-creator of the Heath–Jarrow–Morton framework for pricing and credit risk model utilized in the financial field.
- John Kelly, (1923–1965), American physicist, Bell Labs scientist, best known for formulating the Kelly criterion.
- Sang Bin Lee, author of the Ho–Lee model.
- Martin L. Leibowitz, developed dedicated portfolio theory.
- Francis Longstaff, (born 1956), known for the Longstaff-Schwartz interest rate model.
- Frederick Macaulay, (1882–1970), Canadian-American economist, introduced the concept of Bond duration.
- Harry Markowitz, (1927–2023), American economist, Nobel Memorial Prize in Economic Sciences. Pioneering work in Modern Portfolio Theory.
- Benoît Mandelbrot, (1924–2010) was a French American mathematician, the father of fractal geometry.
- Robert C. Merton, (born 1944), American economist, and laureate Nobel Memorial Prize in Economic Sciences.
- John von Neumann, (1903–1957), Hungarian American mathematician made major contributions to a vast range of fields
- Victor Niederhoffer, (born 1943), American, the father of Statistical arbitrage and of Market microstructure studies.
- Stephen Ross, (1944–2017), American, known for initiating several important theories and models in financial economics.
- Mark Rubinstein, (1944–2019), American, a senior academic in the field of finance, focusing on derivatives, particularly options.
- Myron Scholes, (born 1941), Canadian-American, financial economist who is best known as one of the authors of the Black–Scholes equation.
- Eduardo Schwartz, (born 1940), American, pioneering research in the real options method of pricing investments under uncertainty.
- Claude Shannon, (1916–2001), American, mathematician, electronic engineer, and cryptographer known as "the father of Information Theory".
- William F. Sharpe, (born 1934), American Nobel Memorial Prize in Economic Sciences, one of the originators of the Capital Asset Pricing Model.
- Nassim Nicholas Taleb, (born 1960), Lebanon, considers himself less a businessman than an epistemologist of randomness.
- Thales, (c. 624 BC – c. 546 BC), Greek, one of the Seven Sages of Greece, made the first recorded option trade.
- Ed Thorp, (born 1932), American author of Beat the Dealer, the first book to mathematically prove, in 1962, that the house advantage in blackjack could be overcome by card counting.
- Alan White, noted for the Hull-White model.
- Oldrich Vasicek, (born 1942), Czech, breakthrough paper, describing the dynamics of the yield curve; see Vasicek model.

== Other well-known figures ==
- Cliff Asness, (born 1966), American, co-founder of AQR Capital Management, credited with popularizing value and momentum strategies.
- David Blitz, (born 1973), Dutch, founding researcher of Robeco Quantitative Investments contributor to factor investing literature.
- Jean-Philippe Bouchaud, (born 1962), French physicist and econophysicist, former editor of Quantitative Finance.
- Damiano Brigo, (born 1966), Italian, known for results in systems theory, probability and mathematical finance.
- Aaron Brown, (born 1956), American risk expert, known for the idea that the economics of modern global derivatives evolved from gambling.
- Gunduz Caginalp, (1952–2021), Turkish American, researcher known for work in quantitative behavioral finance.
- Neil Chriss, American, mathematician, academic, hedge fund manager, first director of the Courant Institute Mathematical Finance Program.
- Jakša Cvitanić, (born 1962), Croatian, Professor of Mathematical Finance at the California Institute of Technology.
- Raphael Douady, (born 1959) French mathematician, Head of Laboratory of Excellence on Financial Regulation at the Sorbonne.
- Darrell Duffie, (born 1954) Canadian, Dean Witter Distinguished Professor of Finance at Stanford Graduate School of Business.
- Bruno Dupire, (born 1958), French, known for showing how to derive a local volatility model.
- Frank J. Fabozzi, American, prolific author, co-developer of the Kalotay–Williams–Fabozzi model.
- J. Doyne Farmer, (born 1952), American, one of the founders of the Prediction Company.
- Jim Gatheral, Scottish, known for work on the volatility smile and the volatility surface.
- Hélyette Geman French mathematician known for change of numeraire methods in mathematical finance.
- Kenneth C. Griffin, (born 1968), is an American hedge fund manager.
- Albert Hibbs, (1924–2003) noted American mathematician and the "voice" of JPL.
- Peter Jaeckel, German mathematician who has influenced the development of the use of Monte Carlo methods in Mathematical Finance.
- Mark S. Joshi, (1969–2017) British Australian author, researcher and consultant in mathematical finance.
- Andrew Kalotay, (born 1941), Hungarian-American, Wall Street quant and chess master, statistician and mathematician.
- Nicole El Karoui, (born 1944), mathematician, and pioneer in the development of Mathematical Finance.
- Piotr Karasinski, quantitative finance pioneer; best known for the Black–Karasinski model.
- Sheen T. Kassouf, (1929–2006) economist known for research in financial mathematics.
- David X. Li, (born c. 1960s), Chinese, pioneered the use of Gaussian copula models for the pricing of collateralized debt obligations (CDOs).
- Andrew Lo, (born 1960), leading authority on hedge funds and financial engineering; he proposed the Adaptive market hypothesis.
- David Luenberger, (born 1937), mathematical scientist known for his research and his textbooks.
- William Margrabe author of Margrabe's formula.
- Fabio Mercurio, (born 1966), Italian, mathematician, internationally known for incomplete markets theory.
- Attilio Meucci, Italian, applied mathematician, known for refining the Black–Litterman model and other portfolio and risk management methodologies.
- Salih Neftçi, (1947–2009) leading expert in the fields of stochastic processes and financial engineering.
- Norman Packard, (born 1954), American, is a chaos theory physicist and one of the founders of the Prediction Company and ProtoLife.
- William Perraudin, British, economist, specializing in the fields of risk and pricing of debt instruments.
- Riccardo Rebonato, former physicist specializing in yield curve modeling and risk management.
- Isaak Russman, (1938–2005) was a Russian mathematician and economist.
- David E. Shaw, (born 1951) computer scientist and computational biochemist who founded D. E. Shaw & Co.
- Peng Shige, (born 1947), Chinese, mathematician noted for his contributions in stochastic analysis and mathematical finance.
- Steven E. Shreve, academic and widely read author in mathematical finance.
- James Harris Simons, (1938–2024), American hedge fund manager, mathematician, and philanthropist.
- Case Sprenkle, early researcher in option pricing theory.
- Stuart Turnbull, co-developer of the Jarrow–Turnbull model for credit risk
- Pim van Vliet, (born 1977), Dutch quantitative fund manager, researcher with contributions to low-volatility investing.
- Paul Wilmott, (born 1959) UK researcher, consultant and lecturer in quantitative finance.
- Marc Yor, (1949–2014), French mathematician, known for work on stochastic processes, especially properties of semimartingales, Brownian motion and other Lévy processes.
