= Fairmat =

Financial software

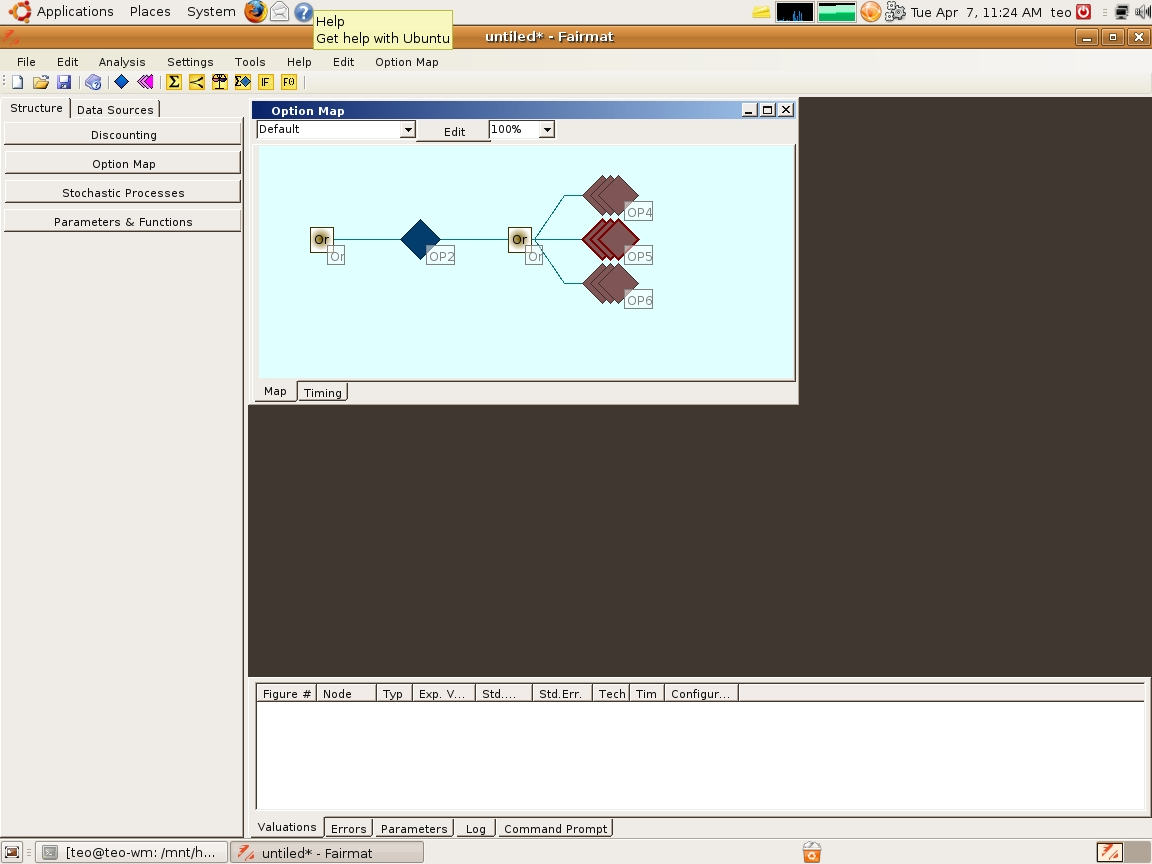
- Fairmat Academic
- Developer(s): Fairmat SRL
- Stable release: 1.6.0 (1.6.0-743) / September 13, 2013; 11 years ago
- Operating system: Windows Linux Mac OS X
- Type: Financial modeling software
- License: Free for personal and academic use, commercial for companies. The software uses a proprietary license
- Website: www.fairmat.com

Fairmat is a free-of-charge multi-platform software that allows to model financial contracts (e.g. a derivative contract) or projects with many contingencies (e.g. a Real Options model) by decomposing it into basic parts. Complex structures and dependencies are modelled using a graphical interface. Virtually any pay-off function and asset class( from interest rate derivatives to equity-linked notes) can be described using a simple algebraic language.

Fairmat is available for Linux, Microsoft Windows, Mac OS X and Ubuntu.

== Features ==
- Fairmat provides a high level abstraction and allows users to price and perform analysis for new derivative contracts or project by modelling it with a bottom-up procedure, with no knowledge of programming languages. The generated models can then be solved by using Monte Carlo simulation, binomial trees or closed form procedures (e.g. the black model).
- The information about the structure of every project model is contained in an xml file and can be exchanged with third parties.
- Fairmat capabilities can be extended and specialized by plug-ins using the Mono.addins extensibility model. Available plug-ins can be found on, and while few of the plug-ins are closed source software, many of them are open source and their development can be followed on the Fairmat github page.

== Open Source Plug-ins ==
The following plug-ins are released under the LGPL license:

=== Interest rate models ===
- The Hull and White one and two factors models.
- The Pelsser squared gaussian model plug-in.

=== Equity models ===
- The Heston stochastic volatility model plug-in.
- The Dupire local volatility model plug-in.
- The Variance Gamma model plug-in.

=== Data Provider integration ===
- Integration plug-ins for data from the European Central Bank, Yahoo! Finance, and MEFF

=== Other open source plug-ins ===
- Quantum random generator support: the plug-in uses a web service provided by the university of Berlin. For more details see .

== Free plug-ins ==
Among the other, the following plug-in are free:

- The IAS 39 Hedge Accounting plug-in allows users to generate IAS 39 accounting reports for derivatives.
- The Geometric Brownian Motion plug-in implements the calibration of the Geometric Brownian motion model using different techniques.

== Commercial plug-ins ==
- The Economic Scenarios Generator plug-in generates market consistent risk-neutral and real-world economic scenarios for several asset classes such as zero coupon bonds (ZCB), Inflation Rates, defaultable bonds / credit spreads and baskets of equities and indices

== Related services ==
From version 1.4 Fairmat supports an on-demand data pricing service offered by the same producers.
