= Brigo =

Brigo is a surname. Notable people with the surname include:

- Damiano Brigo (born 1966), Italian applied mathematician
- Damiano Brigo (basketball) (born 1973), Italian basketball player
- Juan Brigo (c. 1928–1991), Argentine field hockey player
