= Stuart Turnbull =

American economist

Stuart M. Turnbull is professor emeritus, the Bauer College of Business at the University of Houston. He is a recognized authority in pricing derivative securities, and in credit risk management. The Jarrow-Turnbull model is the standard framework used for pricing credit derivatives.

== Biography ==
He holds a Ph.D. in financial economics from the University of British Columbia, and from the Imperial College of Science and Technology, an M.Sc. and DIC in statistics and operational research, and a B.Sc. and ARCS in physics. His current research is focused on (a) pricing credit risky securities, (b) the impact of news on the price dynamics of oil futures and (c) pricing contracts in commodity markets.

He is an associate editor Journal of Credit Risk and the International Journal of Theoretical and Applied Finance. He is a member of the advisory board of the International Review of Applied Financial Issues and Economics, and the International Review of Banking and Financial Studies. He is an individual member of the Centre for Financial Industries, the Fields Institute. He was previously editor of the Journal of Credit Risk and an associate editor of the Journal of Derivatives, Journal of Finance and Mathematical Finance.

He was a senior vice president, fixed income research, Lehman Brothers, New York. Prior to joining Lehman Brothers, he was vice president, Risk Management Division, Canadian Imperial Bank of Commerce, Toronto, Ontario. He was the Bank of Montreal chair of banking and finance and professor of economics at Queen’s University and professor of economics, University of Toronto.

== Works ==
Professor Turnbull has authored over sixty academic papers in the areas of financial economics, law and economics, and the general area of derivatives He has also published two books on derivatives. His book with Robert A. Jarrow, Derivative Securities, is a standard in the industry. Their paper, "Pricing Derivatives on Financial Securities Subject to Credit Risk," is cited repeatedly in credit modeling research.
