= Alan White (economist) =

Alan D. White is a Canadian financial engineering academic. He is a emeritus professor of finance at the University of Toronto and is best known for the Hull-White interest rate model and associated numerical procedures, authored with John Hull.

He is the Peter L. Mitchelson/SIT Investment Associates Foundation Chair in Investment Strategy and Professor of Finance at the Rotman School of Management. He is also the associate editor of Journal of Financial and Quantitative Analysis and the Journal of Derivatives. Previously, he was assistant professor at York University. His highest cited paper is The pricing of options on assets with stochastic volatilities at 4900 citations, according to Google Scholar.

His research is in the areas of executive stock options, the rating of structured finance products and in best practice risk management approaches. With John Hull, he has made "seminal contributions" to the literature on stochastic volatility models, and credit derivative models. He is the co-author of Hull-White On Derivatives (ISBN 1899332456). He holds a PhD Finance (University of Toronto 1983), MBA (McMaster University) and BEng (McGill University).

== Research ==
Much of White's research has been conducted with John C. Hull. In 1990, Hull and White published "Pricing Interest-Rate-Derivative Securities" in The Review of Financial Studies, developing extensions of the Vasicek and Cox–Ingersoll–Ross one-factor interest-rate models that could be fitted to the current term structure of interest rates and to observed interest-rate volatilities. The resulting Hull–White model became a widely used framework for valuing interest-rate derivatives. Hull and White subsequently developed numerical procedures and interest-rate trees for implementing term-structure models and methods for calibrating them to market prices. Hull and White won the Nikko-LOR research competition for their work on one-factor interest-rate models.

White also contributed to the development of stochastic volatility option-pricing models. In a 1987 paper in The Journal of Finance, Hull and White derived a series solution for pricing European options when volatility is stochastic and independent of the underlying asset price, and numerical solutions when volatility and the asset price are correlated. His later research with Hull included the valuation of credit default swaps and other credit derivatives.

== Selected publications ==
=== Papers ===
- Corporate Governance and Dual Class Equity; with Chris Robinson and John Rumsey; Canadian Journal of Administrative Sciences; forthcoming
- Using Hull-White Interest Rate Trees; with John Hull; Journal of Derivatives; Issue: Vol.3; 1996; Pages: pp. 26–36
- A Note on the Models of Hull and White for Pricing Options on the Term Structure: Response; with John Hull; Journal of Fixed Income; Issue: Vol.5; 1995; Pages: pp. 97–102
- The Impact of Default Risk on the Prices of Options and other Derivative Securities; Journal of Banking and Finance; Issue: June; 1995; Pages: pp. 299–322

=== Books ===
- Hull-White on Derivatives with John Hull; London: Risk Publications; 1996
