= Van Schuppen =

Van Schuppen is a Dutch and Flemish surname. Notable people with the surname include:

- Anne van Schuppen (born 1960), Dutch former long-distance runner
- Boris van Schuppen (born 2001), Dutch footballer
- Jacob van Schuppen (1670–1751), Baroque painter
- Jan H. van Schuppen (born 1947), Dutch mathematician and an academic researcher
- Pieter van Schuppen (1627–1702), Flemish painter and engraver and father of Jacob van Schuppen
