= MCSS =

MCSS is an initialism that may refer to:

- Mannix College Students' Society, an organization at Mannix College (Monash University)
- Master of Crop and Soil Science, a degree offered by the University of Georgia College of Agricultural and Environmental Sciences
- Mathematics of Control, Signals, and Systems, an academic journal
- Ministry of Community and Social Services (Ontario)
- Mudgeeraba Creek State School
