= Korn–Kreer–Lenssen model =

The Korn–Kreer–Lenssen model (KKL model) is a discrete trinomial model proposed in 1998 by Ralf Korn, Markus Kreer and Mark Lenssen to model illiquid securities and to value financial derivatives on these.

It generalizes the binomial Cox-Ross-Rubinstein model in a natural way as the stock in a given time interval can either rise one unit up, fall one unit down or remain unchanged. In contrast to Black–Scholes or Cox-Ross-Rubinstein model the market consisting of stock and cash is not complete yet. To value and replicate a financial derivative an additional traded security related to the original security needs to be added. This might be a Low Exercise Price Option (or short LEPO). The mathematical proof of arbitrage free pricing is based on martingale representations for point processes pioneered in the 1980s and 1990 by Albert Shiryaev, Robert Liptser and Marc Yor.

The dynamics is based on continuous time linear birth–death processes and analytic formulae for option prices and Greeks can be stated. Later work looks at market completion with general calls or puts. A comprehensive introduction may be found in the attached MSc-thesis.

The model belongs to the class of trinomial models and the difference to the standard trinomial tree is the following: if $\Delta t$ denotes the waiting time between two movements of the stock price then in the KKL-model $\Delta t$ remains finite and exponentially distributed whereas in trinomial trees the time is discrete and the limit $\Delta t \rightarrow 0$ is taken by numerical extrapolation afterwards.

== See also ==
- Binomial options pricing model
- Trinomial tree
- Valuation of options
- Option: Model implementation

== Literature ==
- Ralf Korn, Markus Kreer and Mark Lenssen: "Pricing of european options when the underlying stock price follows a linear birth–death process", Stochastic Models Vol. 14(3), 1998, pp. 647–662
- Xiong Chen: "The Korn–Kreer–Lenssen Model as an alternative for option pricing", Willmott Magazine June 2004, pp. 74–80
