= Black–Karasinski model =

Mathematical model of interest rate terms

In financial mathematics, the Black–Karasinski model is a mathematical model of the term structure of interest rates; see short-rate model. It is a one-factor model as it describes interest rate movements as driven by a single source of randomness. It belongs to the class of no-arbitrage models, i.e. it can fit today's zero-coupon bond prices, and in its most general form, today's prices for a set of caps, floors or European swaptions. The model was introduced by Fischer Black and Piotr Karasinski in 1991.

== Model ==
The main state variable of the model is the short rate, which is assumed to follow the stochastic differential equation (under the risk-neutral measure):

$$d\ln(r) = [\theta_t-\phi_t \ln(r)] \, dt + \sigma_t\, dW_t$$

where dW_{t} is a standard Brownian motion. The model implies a log-normal distribution for the short rate and therefore the expected value of the money-market account is infinite for any maturity.

In the original article by Fischer Black and Piotr Karasinski the model was implemented using a binomial tree with variable spacing, but a trinomial tree implementation is more common in practice, typically a log-normal application of the Hull–White lattice.

== Applications ==
The model is used mainly for the pricing of exotic interest rate derivatives such as American and Bermudan bond options and swaptions, once its parameters have been calibrated to the current term structure of interest rates and to the prices or implied volatilities of caps, floors or European swaptions. Numerical methods (usually trees) are used in the calibration stage as well as for pricing. It can also be used in modeling credit default risk, where the Black–Karasinski short rate expresses the (stochastic) intensity of default events driven by a Cox process; the guaranteed positive rates are an important feature of the model here. Recent work on Perturbation Methods in Credit Derivatives has shown how analytic prices can be conveniently deduced in many such circumstances, as well as for interest rate options.
