= Robert Almgren =

American mathematician

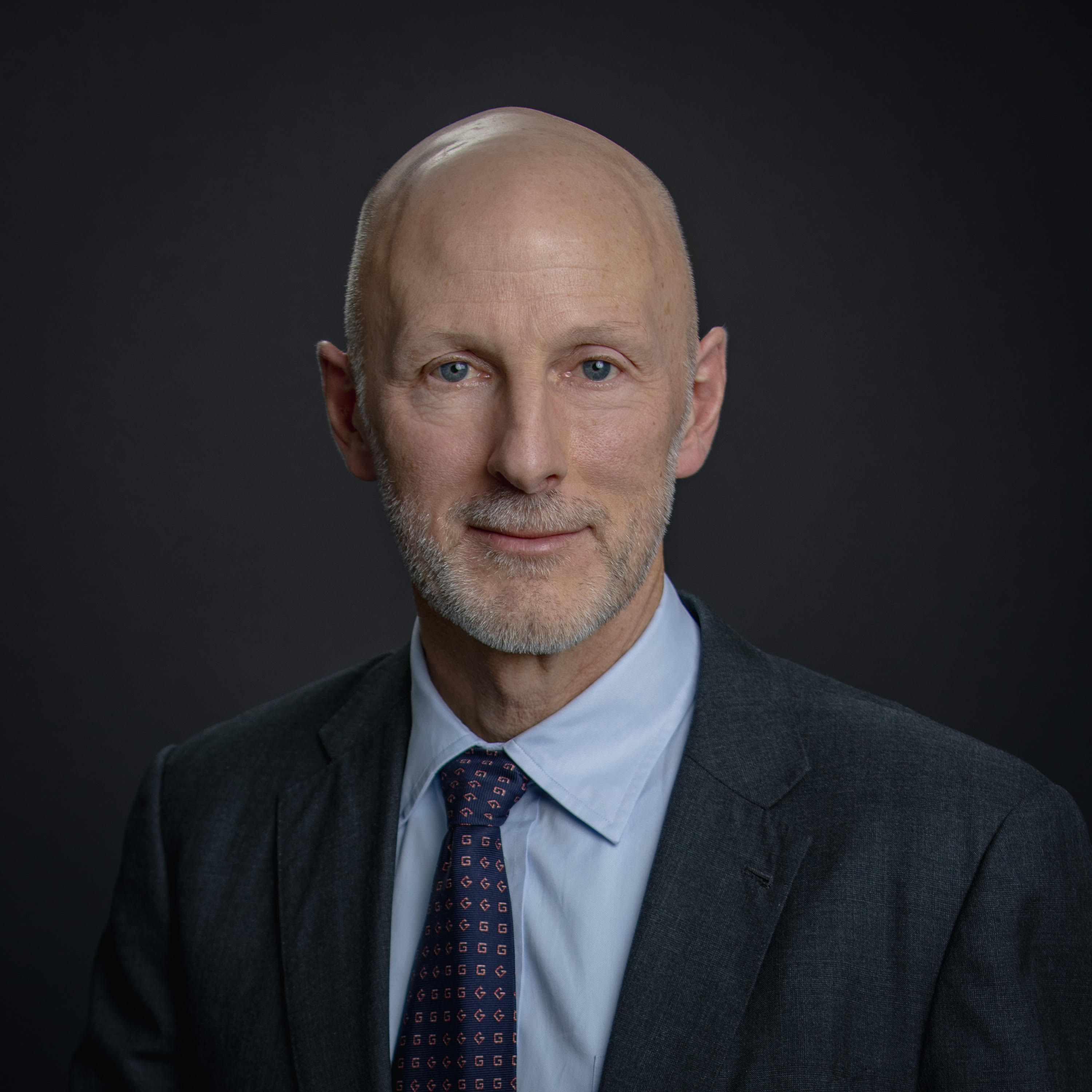
Robert Almgren

Robert F. Almgren is an applied mathematician, academic, and businessman focused on market microstructure and order execution. He is the son of Princeton mathematician Frederick J. Almgren, Jr. With Neil Chriss, he wrote the seminal paper "Optimal Execution of Portfolio Transactions," which Institutional Investor said "helped lay the groundwork for arrival-price algorithms being developed on Wall Street." In 2008 with Christian Hauff, he cofounded Quantitative Brokers (QB), a financial technology company providing agency algorithmic execution in futures and interest rate markets. He is currently chief scientist at QB and a professor of the Practice in Operations Research and Financial Engineering at Princeton University.

== Education ==
Robert Almgren completed a B.S. in physics and a B.S. in mathematics at the Massachusetts Institute of Technology, then an M.S. in applied mathematics at Harvard University. He received his Ph.D. in applied and computational mathematics from Princeton University in 1989, having completed a dissertation under Andrew Majda on the resonant interaction of acoustic waves in gaseous combustion.

== Early career ==
He was a visiting member at the Courant Institute of Mathematical Sciences at New York University and then took a postdoctoral position at the University of Paris 7 under Claude Bardos. From 1993 to 2000, he was an assistant professor in mathematics at the University of Chicago, where his research focused on free boundary problems in liquid droplets and crystal growth and where he helped found the Master of Science in Financial Mathematics program. From 2000 to 2005, he was a tenured associate professor at the University of Toronto, where he was director of the Masters in Mathematical Finance program. In 2005, he left academia to become head of quantitative strategies and a managing director in the Electronic Trading Services group in Bank of America, where he developed the Instinct algorithm for adaptive trade execution in small-cap equities.

== Significant research ==
His best-known paper is "Optimal Execution of Portfolio Transactions", published in 2000, which he wrote with Neil Chriss. This paper introduced a simple model for permanent and temporary market impact and proposed that optimal trade execution trajectories are a balance between trading slowly to minimize market impact, and trading rapidly to reduce volatility risk relative to an arrival price or implementation shortfall benchmark. This work has been widely cited and extended by Almgren and others. In 2005, with a group of quantitative analysts at Citigroup, he published an empirical model for equity market impact, which became a central ingredient in Citi's BECS portfolio management system.
