= Constant maturity credit default swap =

A constant maturity credit default swap (CMCDS) is a type of credit derivative product, similar to a standard credit default swap (CDS). Addressing CMCDS typically requires prior understanding of credit default swaps. In a CMCDS the protection buyer makes periodic payments to the protection seller (these payments constitute the premium leg), and in return receives a payoff (protection or default leg) if an underlying financial instrument defaults. Differently from a standard CDS, the premium leg of a CMCDS does not pay a fixed and pre-agreed amount but a floating spread, using a traded CDS as a reference index. More precisely, given a pre-assigned time-to-maturity, at any payment instant of the premium leg the rate that is offered is indexed at a traded CDS spread on the same reference credit existing in that moment for the pre-assigned time-to-maturity (hence the name "constant maturity" CDS). The default or protection leg is mostly the same as the leg of a standard CDS. Often CMCDS are expressed in terms of participation rate. The participation rate may be defined as the ratio between the present value of the premium leg of a standard CDS with the same final maturity and the present value of the premium leg of the constant maturity CDS. CMCDS may be combined with CDS on the same entity to take only spread risk and not default risk on an entity. Indeed, as the default leg is the same, buying a CDS and selling a CMCDS or vice versa will offset the default legs and leave only the difference in the premium legs, that are driven by spread risk. Valuation of CMCDS has been explored by Damiano Brigo in 2004 and Anlong Li in 2006.
