= Market microstructure =

How trading mechanisms and market design shape prices, liquidity, and transaction costs

Market microstructure is a branch of finance concerned with the details of how exchange occurs in markets. While the theory of market microstructure applies to the exchange of real or financial assets, more evidence is available on the microstructure in the financial field due to the availability of transactions data from them. The major thrust of market microstructure research examines the ways in which the working processes of a market affect determinants of transaction costs, prices, quotes, volume, and trading behavior. In the twenty-first century, innovations have allowed an expansion into the study of the impact of market microstructure on the incidence of market abuse, such as insider trading, market manipulation and broker-client conflict.

== Definition ==
Maureen O'Hara defines market microstructure as "the study of the process and outcomes of exchanging assets under explicit trading rules. While much of economics abstracts from the mechanics of trading, microstructure literature analyzes how specific trading mechanisms affect the price formation process."

The National Bureau of Economic Research has a market microstructure research group that, it says, "is devoted to theoretical, empirical, and experimental research on the economics of securities markets, including the role of information in the price discovery process, the definition, measurement, control, and determinants of liquidity and transactions costs, and their implications for the efficiency, welfare, and regulation of alternative trading mechanisms and market structures".

== Issues ==
Microstructure deals with issues of market structure and design, price formation and price discovery, transaction and timing cost, volatility, information and disclosure, liquidity depth, and market participant behavior. The Epps effect relates the mechanics of high frequency markets to the observed correlation dynamics.

The 1966 paper "Market Making and Reversal on the Stock Exchange", by professor and hedge fund manager Victor Niederhoffer and M.F.M. Osborne, has been credited as market microstructure studies' founding document.

=== Market structure and design ===
This factor focuses on the relationship between price determination and trading rules. In some markets, for instance, assets are traded primarily through dealers who keep an inventory (e.g., new cars), while other markets are facilitated primarily by brokers who act as intermediaries (e.g. housing). One of the important questions in microstructure research is how market structure affects trading costs and whether one structure is more efficient than another. Market microstructure relate the behavior of market participants, whether investors, dealers, investor admins to authority, hence microstructure is a critical factor that affects the investment decision as well as investment exit.

=== Price formation and discovery ===
This factor focuses on the process by which the price for an asset is determined. For example, in some markets prices are formed through an auction process (e.g. eBay), in other markets prices are negotiated (e.g., new cars) or simply posted (e.g. local supermarket) and buyers can choose to buy or not.

Mercantilism and the later quantity theory of money developed by monetary economists differed in their analysis of price behavior with regard to the stability of output. For mercantilist writers the value of money was the capital it could be exchanged for and it followed that the level was output would therefore be a function of the supply of money available to a country. Under the quantity theory of money the concept of money was more tied to its circulation, therefore output was assumed to be fixed or else, independently variable.

=== Transaction cost and timing cost ===
This factor focuses on transaction cost and timing cost and the impact of transaction cost on investment returns and execution methods. Transaction costs include order processing costs, adverse selection costs, inventory holding costs, and monopoly power. Their impact on liquidation of large portfolios has been investigated by Neil Chriss and Robert Almgren and their impact on hedging portfolios has been studied by Tianhui Li and Robert Almgren.

=== Volatility ===
This factor focuses on the tendency for prices to fluctuate. Prices may change in response to new information that affects the value of the instrument (i.e. fundamental volatility), or in response to the trading activity of impatient traders and its effect of liquidity (i.e. transitory volatility).

=== Liquidity ===
This factor focuses on the ease with which instruments can be converted into cash without affecting its market price. Liquidity is an important measure of a market's efficiency. A variety of elements affect liquidity, including tick size and function of market makers.

=== Information and disclosure ===
This factor focuses on the market information, and more particularly, the availability of market information among market participants, and transparency, and the impact of the information on the behavior of the market participants. Market information can include price, breadth, spread, reference data, trading volumes, liquidity or risk factors, and counterparty asset tracking, etc.

== See also ==
- Epps effect
