= William Perraudin =

British economist

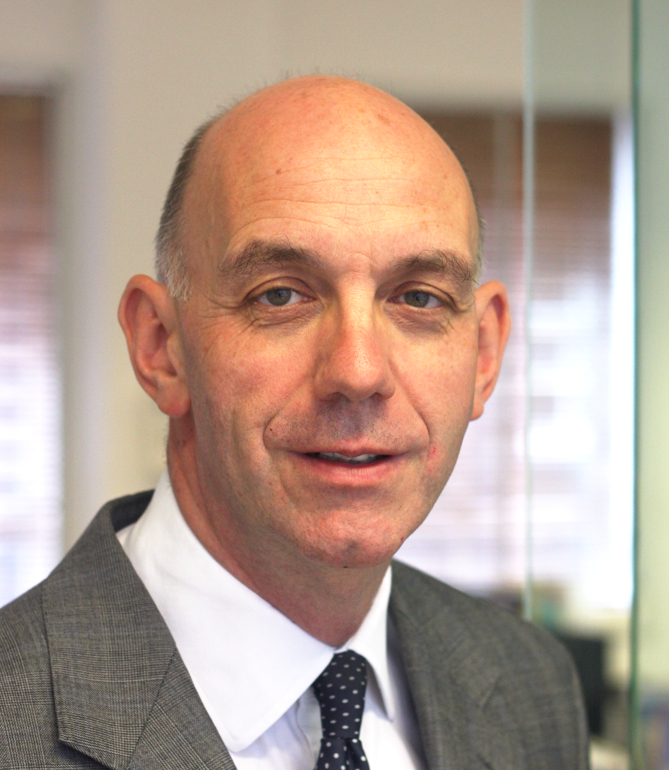
- Perraudin in 2015

Academic background
- Doctoral advisor: Dale W. Jorgenson

William R. M. Perraudin is a British economist. He is an adjunct professor and former Chair of Finance at Imperial College London, specialising in the fields of risk and pricing of debt instruments. He is a director of the risk management software and consultancy firm Risk Control Limited.

As an expert in the field of risk as applied to financial regulation, Perraudin has been a special advisor to the Bank of England. He has long taken the position that the financial models in use by major institutions are insufficiently conservative.

== Education ==
From 1977 to 1981, William Perraudin studied French and History at the University of Oxford. From 1981 to 1983, he studied for a MSc in economics at London School of Economics, before gaining a PhD in economics from Harvard University. He earned an M.S. in applied mathematics, 1987 to 1988, also from Harvard.

== Career ==
Before moving to Imperial, Professor Perraudin headed the finance group of Birkbeck College, University of London. He also taught at Cambridge University

He is an associate editor of Quantitative Finance, the Journal of Banking and Finance and the Journal of Credit Risk.

== Selected publications ==
- Bernardi, Simone; Perraudin, William; Yang, Peng (2015). "Capital Floors, the Revised SA and the Cost of Loans in Switzerland" (PDF). www.fuw.ch.
- Perraudin, William (April 2015). "Default Probability Risk and Securitisation Capital". www.researchgate.net.
- Perraudin, William (February 2015). "Risk Control Comment on Antoniades and Tarashev". www.riskcontrollimited.com.
- Duponcheele, Georges; Linden, Alexandre; Perraudin, William (December 2014). "How to Revive the European Securitisation Market: a Proposal for a European SSFA". www.riskcontrollimited.com.
- Duponcheele, Georges; Totouom, Daniel; Perraudin, William (March 2014). "Calibration of the Simplified Supervisory Formula Approach". www.riskcontrollimited.com.
- Duponcheele, Georges; Linden, Alexandre; Perraudin, William (September 2014). "Securitisation Purchases by the ECB – What is "Senior Enough"?". www.riskcontrollimited.com.
- Perraudin, William (January 2014). "Covered Bond versus ABS Liquidity: A Comment on the EBA's Proposed HQLA Definition Risk Control Limited (PDF Download Available)". ResearchGate.
- Perraudin, William (July 2014). "High Quality Securitisation: An Empirical Analysis of the PCS Definition William Perraudin Risk Control Limited". ResearchGate.
- Perraudin, William (2014). "Quantitative Impacts of BCBS 269 Securitisation Capital Approaches" (PDF). www.riskcontrollimited.com.
- Perraudin, William, ed. (2004). Structured credit products : pricing, rating, risk management and Basel II. London: Risk Books. ISBN 1-904339-26-3.
