= Jim Gatheral =

Jim Gatheral is a researcher in the field of mathematical finance, who has contributed to the study of volatility as applied to the pricing and risk management of derivatives. A recurrent subject in his books and papers is the volatility smile, and he published in 2006 a book The Volatility Surface based on a course he taught for six years at New York University, along with Nassim Taleb. More recently his work has moved in the direction of market microstructure, especially as applied to algorithmic trading. He is the author of The Volatility Surface: A Practitioner's Guide.

In March 2010, Jim Gatheral left his position at Merrill Lynch to assume a tenured full professor position at the Financial Engineering Masters Program at Baruch College, where he is teaching volatility surface modeling and market microstructure. Prior to this, he worked at Bank of America and Bankers Trust before heading the Equity Quantitative Analytics group at Merrill Lynch in 1996, where he was a managing director for 17 years. In 1998 he became a fellow of the Masters Program of Mathematics in Finance at the Courant Institute of Mathematical Sciences of New York University, where he was an adjunct professor for 12 years.

In April 2013, Jim Gatheral was named Presidential Professor at Baruch College. In February 2021, together with Professor Mathieu Rosenbaum of École Polytechnique, Jim Gatheral was named 2021 Quant of the Year by Risk.net.

He received his PhD in theoretical physics from Cambridge University (1983), and a B.Sc. in Mathematics and Natural Philosophy from the University of Glasgow.
