= Farshid Jamshidian =

Finance researcher and academic

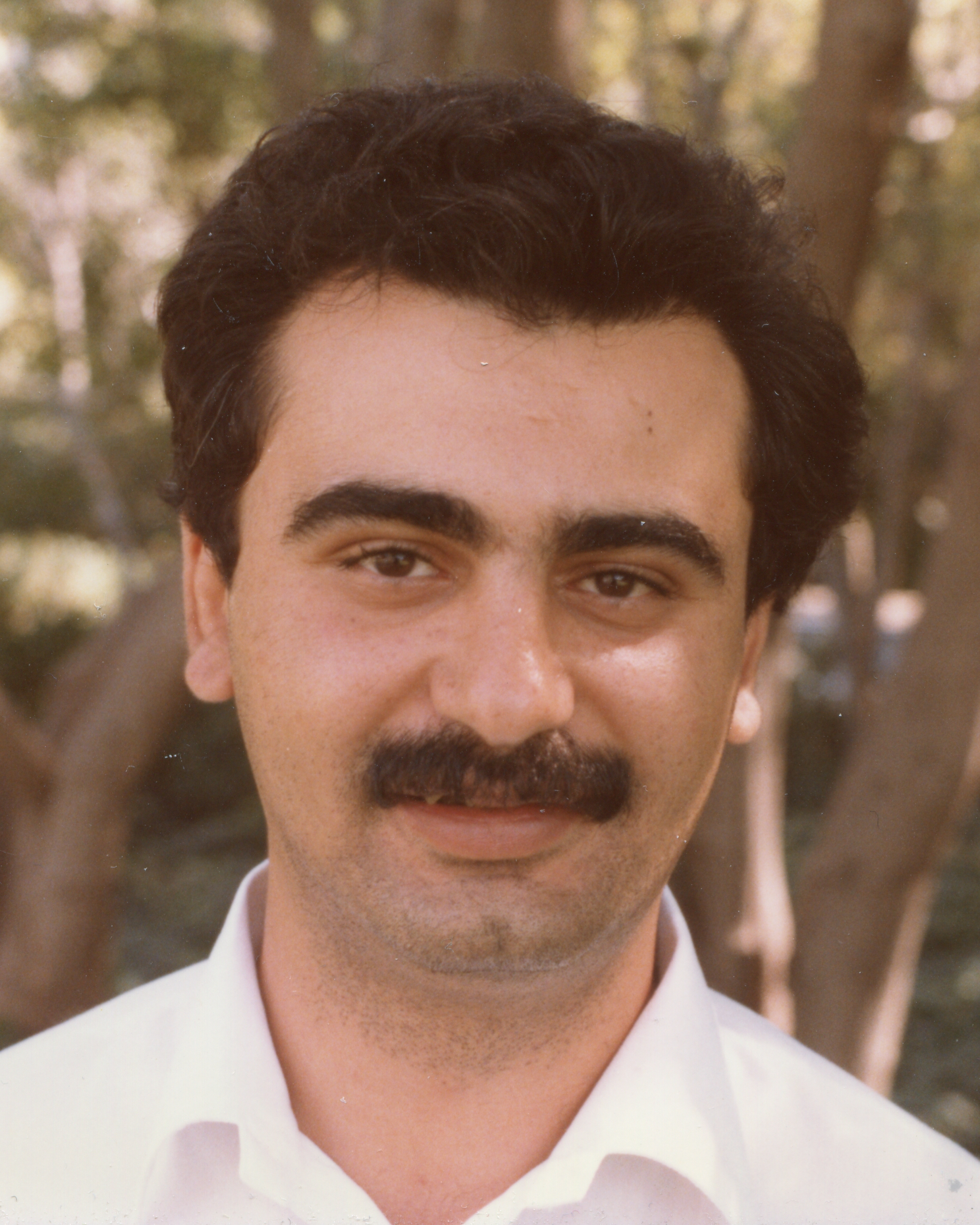
Jamshidian in 1984

Farshid Jamshidian is a finance researcher, academic and practitioner. His experience covers both fixed-income and equity research and trading. Dr. Jamshidian has made important contributions to the theory of derivatives pricing, and has published extensively, especially on interest rate modelling, amongst other contributions, developing the use of the forward measure, and "Jamshidian's trick", widely applied in the pricing of bond options.

He is professor of Applied Mathematics at the University of Twente, and is at NIBC Bank. He is a member of the editorial board of The Journal of Fixed Income. Previously he was managing director of NetAnalytic, a risk management products and services company he founded in 1999; managing director of New Products and Equity Derivatives at Sakura Global Capital; executive director of Technical Trading at Fuji International Finance; and head of quantitative fixed-income research at Merrill Lynch. As an academic, he was an associate editor of Finance and Stochastics and The Journal of Computational Finance and served as a faculty member in the mathematics departments at the University of Chicago and the University of California, Berkeley.

He earned a Ph.D. in mathematics from Harvard University (1980) and an MSc in computer science from Stanford University.
