= David M. Holland =

Canadian-American mathematician and climate scientist

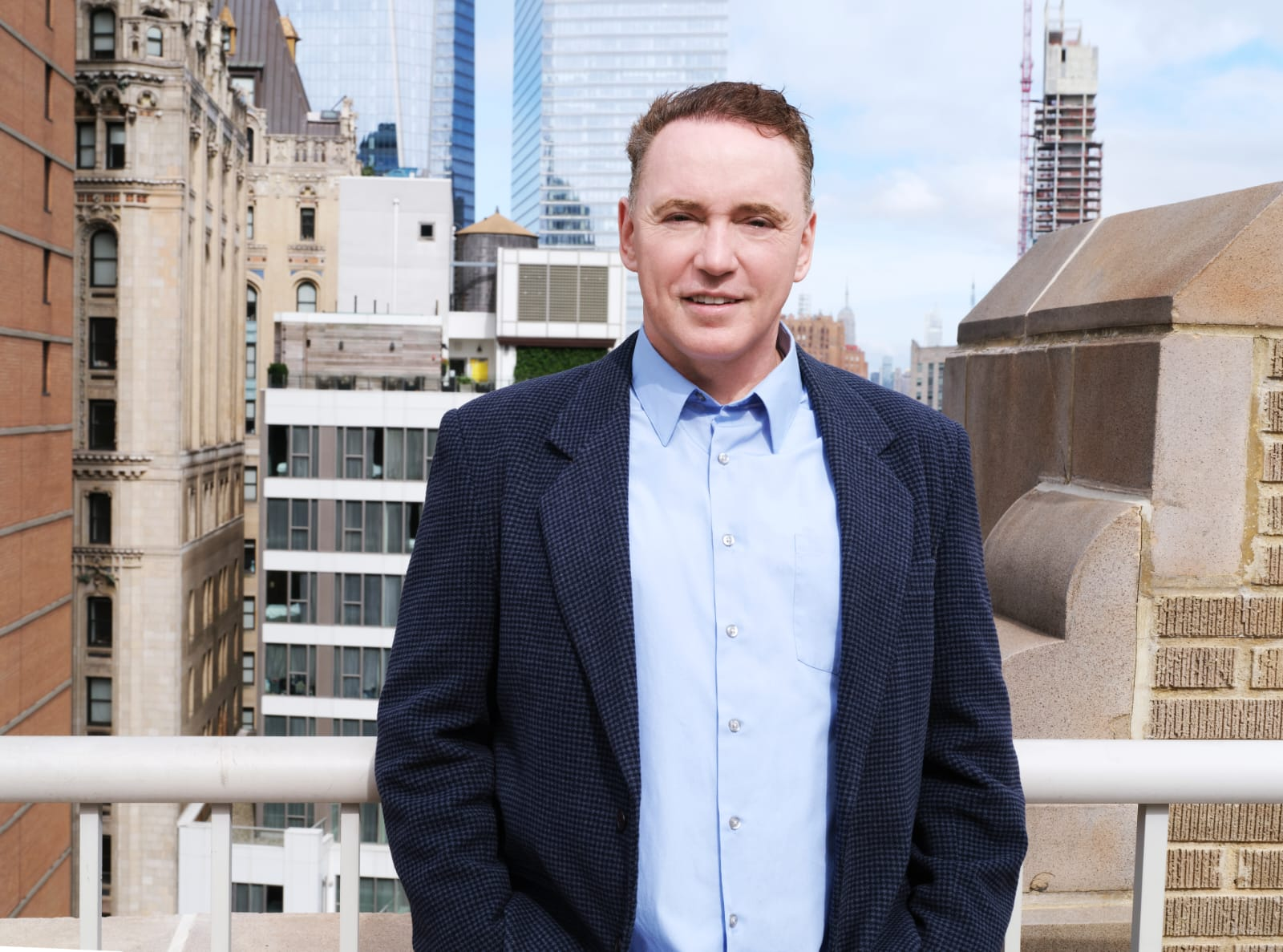
- Education: Memorial University of Newfoundland; McGill University
- Awards: National Science Foundation CAREER Award
- Scientific career
- Fields: Climatology; Ocean science Mathematics
- Workplaces: New York University

David Michael Holland is a Canadian-American climate scientist and mathematician known for his research on the interaction between polar ice sheets and ocean dynamics. He is a professor of Mathematics and Atmosphere/Ocean Science at New York University, Director of the Environmental Fluid Dynamics Laboratory in New York City, and former Director of the Center for Sea Level Change at New York University Abu Dhabi. He received National Science Foundation CAREER Award in 2000.

He has developed model and predict sea-level changes caused by climate change, combining fieldwork in the Earth's most remote regions with computational techniques.

== Education ==
He graduated from Memorial University of Newfoundland in 1985 with a B.Sc. in Physics and a B.A. in Mathematics. He then pursued graduate studies, earning a M.Sc. in Physical Oceanography in 1987. He completed his Ph.D. in Atmosphere-Ocean Science at McGill University in 1993.

== Career ==
Since 1998, Holland has been a faculty member at the Courant Institute of Mathematical Sciences at New York University (NYU), where he became a full professor in 2008. Holland served as the Director of the Center for Atmosphere-Ocean Science at NYU's Courant Institute from 2008 to 2013 and has been the Director of the Center for Sea Level Change at NYU in New York and Abu Dhabi since 2013.

== Research ==
His work focuses on understanding the mechanisms by which significant sea level changes could arise from the ice sheets of Greenland and Antarctica in the coming decades. Holland applies advanced mathematical techniques to data collected in remote environments, particularly from his fieldwork in Greenland and Antarctica, where he has spent over 10 years.

He continues to collect data on glaciers in these regions to improve computer models that project global sea level change based on the interaction between ice sheets and warming ocean waters.

His publications include studies on Jakobshavn Isbræ in Greenland, ice-shelf melting, and Antarctic ice-sheet dynamics.

In 2007, Holland's mathematical models of glacier dynamics, particularly for Greenland’s Jakobshavn glacier, were validated through field observations.

Despite limited prior field experience, Holland and his team ventured to the glacier to gather firsthand data, overcoming conditions.

Holland’s methods include using helicopters to lower sensors into icy waters and developing techniques to penetrate thick ice shelves for data collection.

Holland is an advocate for developing glacier forecasting systems, akin to weather forecasting, to predict the impacts of climate change on polar ice and global sea levels.

Holland has highlighted the global risks, stating that the destabilization of Antarctica’s ice sheets could lead to sea level rises of up to 10 meters, with devastating consequences for coastal regions worldwide.

== Personal life ==
Holland is married to Denise Holland, who collaborates with him as a field and logistics coordinator at NYU.

== Selected publications ==
- Holland, David M.; Thomas, Robert H.; de Young, Brad; Ribergaard, Mads H.; Lyberth, Bjarne (2008). "Acceleration of Jakobshavn Isbræ triggered by warm subsurface ocean waters". Nature Geoscience. 1 (10): 659–664. Bibcode:2008NatGe...1..659H. doi:10.1038/ngeo316. ISSN 1752-0908.
- Davis, Peter E. D.; Nicholls, Keith W.; Holland, David M.; Schmidt, Britney E.; Washam, Peter; Riverman, Kiya L.; Arthern, Robert J.; Vaňková, Irena; Eayrs, Clare; Smith, James A.; Anker, Paul G. D.; Mullen, Andrew D.; Dichek, Daniel; Lawrence, Justin D.; Meister, Matthew M. (2023). "Suppressed basal melting in the eastern Thwaites Glacier grounding zone". Nature. 614 (7948): 479–485. Bibcode:2023Natur.614..479D. doi:10.1038/s41586-022-05586-0. ISSN 1476-4687. PMC 9931584. PMID 36792735.
- Holland, David M.; Jenkins, Adrian (1999-08-01). "Modeling Thermodynamic Ice–Ocean Interactions at the Base of an Ice Shelf". Journal of Physical Oceanography. 29 (8): 1787–1800. Bibcode:1999JPO....29.1787H. doi:10.1175/1520-0485(1999)029<1787:MTIOIA>2.0.CO;2. ISSN 0022-3670.
- Thoma, Malte; Jenkins, Adrian; Holland, David; Jacobs, Stan (2008). "Modelling Circumpolar Deep Water intrusions on the Amundsen Sea continental shelf, Antarctica". Geophysical Research Letters. 35 (18) 2008GL034939. Bibcode:2008GeoRL..3518602T. doi:10.1029/2008GL034939. ISSN 1944-8007.
- Holland, Paul R.; Jenkins, Adrian; Holland, David M. (2008-06-01). "The Response of Ice Shelf Basal Melting to Variations in Ocean Temperature". Journal of Climate. 21 (11): 2558–2572. Bibcode:2008JCli...21.2558H. doi:10.1175/2007JCLI1909.1. ISSN 0894-8755.
- Li, Xichen; Holland, David M.; Gerber, Edwin P.; Yoo, Changhyun (2014). "Impacts of the north and tropical Atlantic Ocean on the Antarctic Peninsula and sea ice". Nature. 505 (7484): 538–542. Bibcode:2014Natur.505..538L. doi:10.1038/nature12945. PMID 24451542.
- Joughin, Ian; Alley, Richard B.; Holland, David M. (2012-11-30). "Ice-Sheet Response to Oceanic Forcing". Science. 338 (6111): 1172–1176. Bibcode:2012Sci...338.1172J. doi:10.1126/science.1226481. PMID 23197526.
- Joughin, Ian; Smith, Benjamin E.; Holland, David M. (2010). "Sensitivity of 21st century sea level to ocean-induced thinning of Pine Island Glacier, Antarctica". Geophysical Research Letters. 37 (20) 2010GL044819. Bibcode:2010GeoRL..3720502J. doi:10.1029/2010GL044819. ISSN 1944-8007.
