= Neil Chriss =

American mathematician

Neil A. Chriss is a mathematician, academic, hedge fund manager, philanthropist and a founding board member of the charity organization "Math for America" which seeks to improve math education in the United States. Chriss also serves on the board of trustees of the Institute for Advanced Study.

== Early career ==
Chriss learned programming at the age of 11. He developed a videogame called D' Fuse and sold it to Tymac when he was a sophomore in high school. The game quickly faded when the Commodore 64 with 64K of memory and much better graphics appeared.

Chriss went to the University of Chicago, where he majored in mathematics. Following his junior year in college, he worked at Fermilab with Myron Campbell and Bruce Denby; he developed a neural network to find b-quark jets. He then earned his master's degree in applied mathematics at Caltech.

Chriss studied pure mathematics at the University of Chicago, working in the Langlands Program. He received a Ph.D. in 1993, with the thesis A Geometric Construction of the Iwahori-Hecke Algebra. With Victor Ginzburg, he wrote a book on algebraic geometry and representation theory.

== Academia ==
Chriss's first academic job (1993–1994) was at the University of Toronto, where he wrote "Representation Theory and Complex Geometry" with Ginzburg. At Toronto, John M. Liew introduced Chriss to "quant" finance, probability theory, stochastic calculus and Black–Scholes option pricing theory.

At the Institute for Advanced Study in 1994–1995, Chriss began the book "Black–Scholes and Beyond: Option Pricing Models" (Irwin, 1996). In 1995, he was hired for the summer in the Quantitative Strategies group of Emanuel Derman at Goldman Sachs. In 1994, Derman and Kani published a paper that showed how to fit a binomial tree to price all options trading in the market at that time. Chriss helped extend their work from binomial to trinomial trees.

Chriss received a grant from NSF and went to Harvard University Mathematics Department in 1996. Despite the offer of an assistant professorship at Harvard in 1997, he moved to Wall Street.

== Wall Street ==
Risk Magazine named Chriss one of the "Top Ten to Watch in the next Ten Years" in 1997.

In 1997, Chriss joined the quant research group in Morgan Stanley to work on portfolio trading for their cash equities operational dealing desk. He wrote a paper "Optimal execution of portfolio transactions" with Robert Almgren. The Institutional Investor published an article about Algorithmic Trading in its November 2004 issue, titled "The Orders Battle", which noted that Chriss's paper "helped lay the groundwork for arrival-price algorithms being developed on Wall Street." The work has been widely cited since. Chriss also wrote articles on the following topics: "Competitive bids for principal program trades", "Value under liquidation". At Morgan Stanley, Peter Muller inspired Chriss to pursue quantitative trading.

In 1998, Chriss moved into portfolio management, joining the Goldman Sachs Asset Management (GSAM) Quantitative Strategies group to develop a new trading strategy, after Cliff Asness, John M. Liew and Bob Krail left to form AQR Capital Management.

In 2000, Chriss left Goldman Sachs to found ICor Brokerage Inc., a derivatives trading firm. In 2001, ICor joined forces with Reuters, forming a joint venture, ICor Brokerage Ltd. Reuters bought out ICor in 2004.

== Mathematical finance education ==
Chriss was asked by New York University Courant Institute of Mathematical Sciences to be the first (part-time) director of the Program in Mathematics in Finance. At Courant from 1997 to 2003, Chriss recruited Jim Gatheral, Steve Allen, Peter Fraenkel (now head of Quantitative IT at UBS) and Nassim Taleb.

In 2003 Chriss became executive director of the University of Chicago Financial Mathematics Program.

== Hedge funds ==
In 2003, Chriss joined the Stamford, Connecticut hedge fund SAC Capital, working there until early 2007.

Chriss then founded the hedge fund "Hutchin Hill Capital". Renaissance Technologies' Meritage Fund provided $300 million of capital to Hutchin Hill.

== Recent research ==
With R. Almgren, Chriss wrote a paper on optimizing a portfolio. They submitted a patent application on the method.

== Books ==
- Neil A. Chriss (1996). Black–Scholes and Beyond: Option Pricing Models. McGraw-Hill Professional. ISBN 0-7863-1025-1.
- Neil A. Chriss (1997). Black–Scholes and Beyond Interactive Toolkit. McGraw-Hill Professional. ISBN 0-7863-1140-1.
- Neil Chriss and Victor Ginzburg (1997). Representation Theory and Complex Geometry. Birkhauser Boston. ISBN 0-8176-3792-3.

Nigel Goldenfeld, a professor of physics at University of Illinois, recommends Chriss's book Black–Scholes and Beyond to those of his students "contemplating a career in quantitative finance", as giving an "Excellent overview of modern day finance, financial models, and their shortcomings. A great blend of practical and theoretical knowledge, clearly presented".
