= Piotr Karasinski =

Piotr Karasinski is a pioneering quantitative analyst, best known for the Black–Karasinski short-rate model which he co-developed with the late Fischer Black. His contributions to quantitative finance include models for interest rates, equity and hybrid products and random volatility.

He is currently Director of Client Solutions at AlgoDynamix (from 2020) and Managing Director at Karasinski Consulting (from 2021). He is on the editorial board of the journal, Quantitative Finance.

Previously, he has held a number of positions at leading firms in New York and London including: Managing Director at HSBC, Director and Head Derivatives Research at Citibank, MD at Chemical Bank, Director at Deutsche Bank and Vice President at Goldman Sachs. He has also served as Senior Advisor at the European Bank for Reconstruction and Development. In a recent review The Black-Karasinski Model: Thirty Years On celebrating the thirty-year anniversary of publication of his seminal paper, he looks back at his early career.

He studied physics at Warsaw University (MSc 1978) and earned his PhD at Yale University (1984).
