= The Journal of Computational Finance =

The Journal of Computational Finance is a peer-reviewed academic journal, published five times per year, covering advances in numerical and computational techniques in pricing, hedging, and risk management of financial instruments. It was established in 1997 and is published by Infopro Digital as part of their Risk Journals portfolio. The editor-in-chief is Christoph Reisinger (Mathematical Institute, University of Oxford). According to the Journal Citation Reports, the journal has a 2015 impact factor of 0.758.
