= Epps effect =

In econometrics and time series analysis, the Epps effect, named after T. W. Epps, is the phenomenon that the empirical correlation between the returns of two different stocks decreases with the length of the interval for which the price changes are measured. The phenomenon is caused by non-synchronous/asynchronous trading and discretization effects. Another study suggests that the effect also originates in investors' herd behavior.
