= Bruno Dupire =

Researcher and lecturer in quantitative finance

Bruno Dupire (born 1958) is a researcher and lecturer in quantitative finance. He is currently Head of Quantitative Research at Bloomberg LP. He is best known for his contributions to local volatility modeling and Functional Itô Calculus. He is also an Instructor at New York University since 2005, in the Courant Master of Science Program in Mathematics in Finance.

== Early life and education ==
Dupire is an alumnus of École normale supérieure Paris-Saclay. He received a master's degree in artificial intelligence from the Pierre and Marie Curie University and his Ph.D. in numerical analysis from the Pontifical Catholic University of Rio de Janeiro.

== Local volatility ==
Dupire is best known for showing how to derive a local volatility model consistent with a surface of option prices across strikes and maturities, establishing the so-called Dupire's approach to local volatility for modeling the volatility smile. The Dupire equation is a partial differential equation (PDE) that links the contemporaneous prices of European call options of all strikes and maturities to the instantaneous volatility of the price process, assumed to be a function of price and time only.

== Functional Itô Calculus ==
Dupire has developed a calculus for path dependency, the Functional Itô Calculus, which extends the Itô Calculus to functions of the current path of the process, not only of its current value. It is a differential Calculus, with novel functional derivatives with respect to space and time, that models causal relationships that are deployed through time. (“Functional Itô Calculus”, 2009, SSRN). It allows to extend many classical results to the non-Markov case.

== Awards ==
Dupire is the recipient of the Risk magazine "Lifetime Achievement Award" for 2008, and has been voted in 2006 as the most important derivatives practitioner of the previous five years in the ICBI Global Derivatives industry survey. He has also been included in Dec' 02 in the Risk magazine "Hall of Fame" of the 50 most influential people in the history of financial derivatives. In 2006, he was awarded the Cutting Edge research award by Wilmott Magazine.

Dupire is the recipient of the prestigious Financial Engineer of the Year (FEOY) award by IAQF for 2025.

== Selected publications ==
Books

- Bruno Dupire (1998). Monte Carlo: methodologies and applications for pricing and risk management. Risk Books. ISBN 978-1899332915.

Papers

- Dupire, B (January 1994). "Pricing with a Smile" (PDF). Risk. 7 (1). Incisive Media.
- Dupire, B (September 1993). "Model Art". Risk. 6 (9). Incisive Media.
- Dupire, B (April 2019). "Functional Itô Calculus". Quantitative Finance. 19 (5): 721–729. doi:10.1080/14697688.2019.1575974.
- Dupire, B (2010). "Dupire equation". In Cont, R (ed.). Encyclopedia of Quantitative Finance. Wiley. doi:10.1002/9780470061602.eqf08003. ISBN 978-0-470-05756-8.
