= Jan H. van Schuppen =

Dutch mathematician

- Born: 6 October 1947 (age 78); Veenendaal
- Citizenship: Dutch
- Education: University of California, Berkeley
- Scientific career
- Fields: Systems Theory, Control Theory
- Workplaces: CWI, TU Delft, Vrije Universiteit
- Thesis: Estimation Theory for Continuous Time Processes, a Martingale Approach (1973)
- Doctoral advisor: Eugene Wong
- Website: ta.twi.tudelft.nl/mf/users/schuppen/

Jan Hendrik van Schuppen (born 6 October 1947) is a Dutch mathematician and Professor at the Department of Mathematics of the Vrije Universiteit, known for his contributions in the field of systems theory, particularly on control theory and system identification, on probability, and on a number of related practical applications.

== Biography ==
Van Schuppen obtained a PhD at the University of California, Berkeley, in 1973, where his PhD supervisor was Pravin Varaiya.

Van Schuppen works as a full professor at the Department of Mathematics of the Free University of Amsterdam and as a research leader at the CWI research institute in Amsterdam. He has been coordinating several European Union funded research networks such as the European Research Network System Identification, for which he has been the Netherlands leader. The lists among the PhD students who worked under van Schuppen's supervision Hendrik (Henk) Nijmeijer, Jan Willem Polderman, Peter Spreij and Damiano Brigo.

Van Schuppen is Editor in Chief of Mathematics of Control, Signals, and Systems, has been Departmental Editor of the Journal of Discrete Event Dynamic Systems in 1990–2000, and has been Associate Editor-at-Large of the prestigious and leading journal IEEE Transactions on Automatic Control in 1999–2001.

== Work ==
Van Schuppen's research interest are in the areas of systems theory and probability. These include system identification, and realization theory, and the area of control theory, with control of discrete-event systems, control of hybrid systems, control and system theory of positive systems, control of stochastic systems, and adaptive control.

He worked also on the filtering problem, on dynamic games and team problems, on probability and stochastic processes, and on applications of the theory including control and system theory of biochemical reaction networks, control of communication systems and networks, and control of motorway traffic in a consultancy for the Dutch administration.

== Publications ==
Van Schuppen has authored more than one hundred publications in the field and is a universally recognized and respected authority in the area. A selection, obtained by Jan van Schuppen's web site, is as follows.

=== Realization theory ===
- J.H. van Schuppen, System theory for system identification, J. Econometrics 188 (2004), 313–339.
- J.M. van den Hof, J.H. van Schuppen, Positive matrix factorization via extremal polyhedral cones, Linear Algebra and its Appl. 293(1999), 171–186.
- J.H. van Schuppen, Equivalences of discrete-event systems and of hybrid systems, Open problems of mathematical systems and control theory, V.D. Blondel, E.D. Sontag, M. Vidyasagar, J.C. Willems, Springer Verlag, London, 1998, 251–257.
- G. Picci, J.M. van den Hof, J.H. van Schuppen, Primes in several classes of the positive matrices, Linear Algebra and its Applications 277 (1998), 149–185.
- J.H. van Schuppen, Stochastic realization of a Gaussian stochastic control system, Acta Applicandae Mathematicae 35(1994), 193–212.
- J.H. van Schuppen, Stochastic realization problems, H. Nijmeijer, J.M. Schumacher (eds.), Three decades of mathematical system theory, Lecture Notes in Control and Information Sciences, volume 135, Springer-Verlag, Berlin, 1989, 480–523.
- J.H. van Schuppen, Stochastic realization problems motivated by econometric modeling, Modeling, Identification and Robust Control, C.I. Byrnes, A. Lindquist (eds.), North-Holland Publ. Co., Amsterdam, 1985, 259–275.
- J.H. van Schuppen, The weak stochastic realization problem for discrete-time counting processes, A. Bensoussan, J.L. Lions (eds.), Analysis and Optimization of Systems, Part 1, Lecture Notes in Control and Information Sciences, Volume 62, Springer-Verlag, Berlin, 1984, 436–444.
- G. Picci and J.H. van Schuppen, On the weak finite stochastic realization problem, Filtering and Control of Random Processes, Proceedings of the ENST-CNET Colloquium, H. Korezlioglu, G. Mazziotto, J. Szpirglas (eds.), Paris, France, Lecture Notes in Control and Information Sciences, Volume 61, Springer-Verlag, Berlin, 1984, 237–242.
- C. van Putten and J.H. van Schuppen, The weak and strong Gaussian probabilistic realization problem, J. Multivariate Anal. 13 (1983), 118–137.
- J.H. van Schuppen, The strong finite stochastic realization problem — preliminary results, Analysis and Optimization of Systems, A. Bensoussan, J.L Lions (eds.), Lecture Notes in Control and Information Sciences, volume 44, Springer-Verlag, Berlin, 1982, 179–190.
- J.H. van Schuppen, A brief introduction to the weak stochastic realization problem, Proceedings National Workshop on Stochastic Dynamic Systems, G.del Grosso (ed.), University of Rome, 1982.
- J.H. van Schuppen and J.C. Willems, Stochastic systems and the problem of state space realization, Geometric methods for the theory of linear systems, C.I. Byrnes, C.F. Martin (eds.), D. Reidel Publ. Co., Dordrecht, 1980, 285–313.

=== System identification ===
- A.A. Stoorvogel, J.H. van Schuppen, Approximation problems with the divergence criterion for Gaussian variables and processes, Systems & Control Lett. 35 (1998), 207–218.
- A.A. Stoorvogel, J.H. van Schuppen, Divergence rate approximation of a stationary Gaussian process by the output of a Gaussian system, Mathematical Theory of Networks and Systems (MTNS98), A. Beghi, L. Finesso, G. Picci (Eds.), Il Poligrafo, Padova, 1998, 879–882.
- A.A. Stoorvogel, J.H. van Schuppen, System identification with information theoretic criteria. In S. Bittanti, G. Picci (Eds.), Identification, adaptation, learning, Springer-Verlag, Berlin, 1996, 289–338.
- A.A. Stoorvogel, J.H. van Schuppen, An H infinity-parameter estimator. Proceedings of the 10th IFAC Symposium on System Identification, Danish Automation Society, Copenhagen, 1994, 3.267–3.270.

=== Control of discrete-event systems ===
- J. Komenda and J.H. van Schuppen and B. Gaudin and H. Marchand, Supervisory control of modular systems with global specification languages, Automatica 44 (2008), 1127–1134.
- J. Komenda, J.H. van Schuppen, Modular control of discrete-event systems with coalgebra, IEEE Transactions on Automatic Control 53 (2008), 447–460.
- Jan Komenda and Jan H. van Schuppen, Control of discrete-event systems with modular or distributed structure, Theoretical Computer Science 388 (2007), 199–226.
- Jan Komenda, Jan H. van Schuppen, Conditions structurelles dans le controle modulaire des systemes a evenements discrets concurrents, Proceedings Modelisation des Systemes Reactifs (MSR) 2007, Eric Niel and Jean-Michel Miller (Editors), Hermes (Lavoisier), Paris, 2007, 53 70.
- Jan Komenda and Jan H. van Schuppen, Optimal solutions of modular supervisory control problems with indecomposable specification languages, pdf file Stephane Lafortune, Feng Lin, Dawn Tilbury (Eds.), Proc. 8th International Workshop on Discrete Event Systems (WODES.2006), (University of Michigan, Ann Arbor, 10–12 July 2006), IEEE Press, New York, 143 148.
- Jan Komenda, Jan H. van Schuppen, Control of discrete-event systems with partial observations using coalgebra and coinduction, J. Discrete Event Dynamic Systems 15 (2005), 257–315.
- Jan H. van Schuppen, Decentralized control with communication between controllers, unsolved problems in mathematical systems and control theory, Vincent D. Blondel, Alexander Megretski (Eds.), Princeton University Press, Princeton, 2004, pp. 144–150.
- Ard Overkamp, Jan H. van Schuppen, Maximal solutions in decentralized supervisory control, SIAM J. Control and Optim. 39(2000), 492–511.

=== Control of hybrid systems ===
- L.C.G.J.M. Habets and J.H. van Schuppen, A control problem for affine dynamical systems on a full-dimensional polytope, Automatica 40 (2004), 21–35.
- J.H. van Schuppen, Control for a class of hybrid systems, in Verification of digital and hybrid systems, M.K. Inan, R.P. Kurshan (Eds.), Springer, Berlin, 2000, 332–354.
- J.H. van Schuppen, A sufficient condition for controllability of a class of hybrid systems, T.A. Henzinger and S. Sastry (Eds.), Hybrid systems: Computation and control, Lecture Notes in Computer Science, Volume 1386, Springer, Berlin, 1998, 374–383.

=== Filtering ===
- Han-Fu Chen, P.R. Kumar, and J.H. van Schuppen, On Kalman filtering for conditionally Gaussian systems with random matrices, Systems and Control Letters 13 (1989), 397–404.
- J.H. van Schuppen, Convergence results for continuous-time adaptive stochastic filtering algorithms, J. Math. Anal. Appl. 96 (1983), 209–225.
- J.H. van Schuppen, Adaptive stochastic filtering problems — the continuous-time case, Stochastic Differential Systems, M. Kohlmann, N. Christopeit (eds.), Lecture Notes in Control and Information Sciences, volume 43, Springer-Verlag, Berlin, 1982, 205–211.
- J.D. van der Bij and J.H. van Schuppen, Adaptive prediction of railway power demand, Automatica J.-IFAC 19 (1983), 487–494.
- J.L. Hibey, D.L. Snyder, and J.H. van Schuppen, Error-probability bounds for continuous-time decision problems, IEEE Trans. Inf. Theory 24 (1978), 608–622.
- J.H. van Schuppen, Filtering, prediction, and smoothing for counting process observations — a martingale approach, SIAM J. Appl. Math. 32 (1977), 552–570.

=== Probability and stochastic processes ===
- C. van Putten and J.H. van Schuppen, Invariance properties of the conditional independence relation, Ann. Probab. 13 (1985), 934–945.
- C. van Putten and J.H. van Schuppen, The weak and strong Gaussian probabilistic realization problem, J. Multivariate Anal. 13 (1983), 118–137.
- J.H. van Schuppen and E. Wong, Transformations of local martingales under a change of law, Ann. of Probab. 2 (1974), 879–888.
