= Attilio Meucci =

Italian statistician

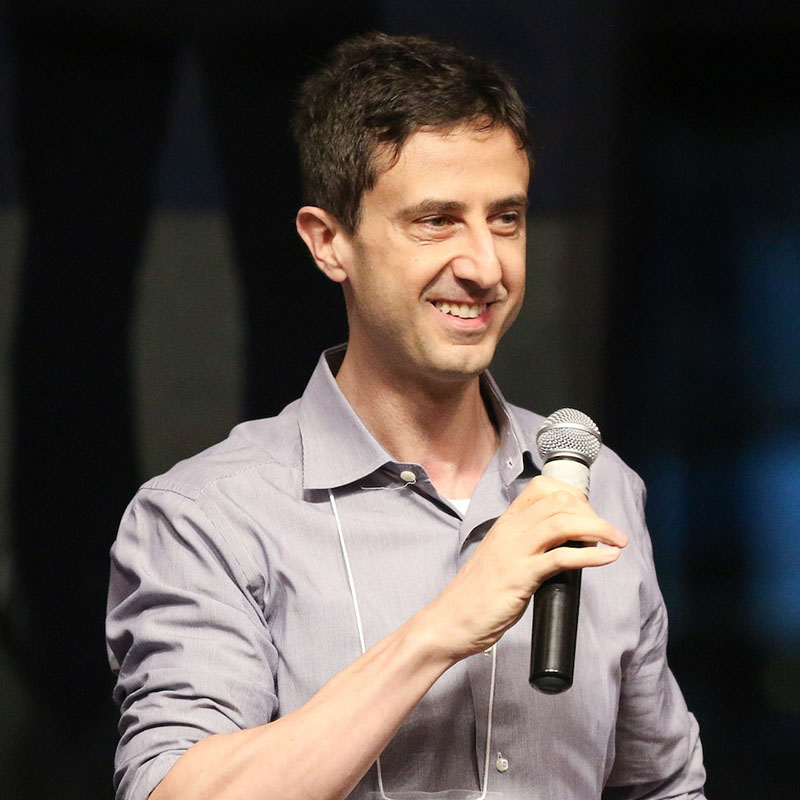
- Attilio Meucci addresses his annual ARPM Quant Bootcamp in 2020
- Education: University of Milan
- Occupations: Investment manager, Economist and Academic
- Notable work: Risk and Asset Allocation

Attilio Meucci is an Italian statistician and financial engineer, who specializes in quantitative risk management and quantitative portfolio management.

== Education ==
Attilio Meucci earned a BA in Physics from the University of Milan, an MA in Economics from Bocconi University, and a PhD in Mathematics from the University of Milan.

== Career ==
Meucci was the chief risk officer at KKR; the chief risk officer and head of portfolio construction at Kepos Capital LP.; head of research at Bloomberg LP's portfolio analytics and risk platform; a researcher at POINT, Lehman Brothers' portfolio analytics and risk platform; a trader at the hedge fund Relative Value International; and a consultant at Bain & Co, a strategic consulting firm.

Meucci is the founder of Advanced Risk and Portfolio Management (ARPM), under whose umbrella he designed and teaches the six-day Advanced Risk and Portfolio Management Bootcamp (ARPM Bootcamp), and manages the charity One More Reason.

== Bibliography ==
- Attilio Meucci (2005). Risk and Asset Allocation (1 ed.). Springer. ISBN 978-3642009648.
