= Mathematics of Control, Signals, and Systems =

- Discipline: Mathematics
- Language: English
- Edited by: Jan H. van Schuppen

Publication details
- History: 1988-present
- Publisher: Springer Science+Business Media
- Frequency: Quarterly
- Impact factor: 0.500 (2011)

Standard abbreviations
- ISO 4: Math. Control Signals Syst.
- MathSciNet: Math. Control Signals Systems

Indexing
- ISSN: 0932-4194 (print); 1435-568X (web)
- LCCN: 88640596
- OCLC no.: 782072556

Links
- Journal homepage; Online access; Online archive

Mathematics of Control, Signals, and Systems is a peer-reviewed scientific journal that covers research concerned with mathematically rigorous system theoretic aspects of control and signal processing. The journal was founded by Eduardo Sontag and Bradley Dickinson in 1988. The editors-in-chief are Lars Gruene, Eduardo Sontag, and Jan H. van Schuppen.

== Abstracting and indexing ==
The journal is abstracted and indexed in Digital Mathematics Registry, Mathematical Reviews, Science Citation Index, Scopus, VINITI Database RAS, and Zentralblatt Math. The journal is abstracted and indexed in Digital Mathematics Registry, Mathematical Reviews, Science Citation Index, Scopus, VINITI Database RAS, and Zentralblatt Math. The journal has a 2019 impact factor of 0.976 (2019)
