= Riccardo Rebonato =

French economist and academic

Riccardo Rebonato is Professor of Finance at EDHEC Business School, Scientific Advisor of the EDHEC Climate Institute, and author of journal articles and books on Mathematical Finance, covering derivatives pricing, risk management, asset allocation and climate change. In 2022 he was granted the PRM Quant of the Year award for 'outstanding contributions to the field of quantitative portfolio theory'. Prior to this, he was Global Head of Rates and FX Analytics at PIMCO.

Professor Rebonato is a specialist in asset pricing and its applications to bond portfolio management, fixed-income derivatives and the impact of climate change on asset prices and risk management. He is Series Editor for the Elements in Quantitative Finance, Cambridge University Press.

Academically, he is an editor of financial journals and was until 2016 a visiting lecturer at Oxford University and adjunct professor at Imperial College’s Tanaka Business School. He used to sit on the board of directors of the International Swaps and Derivatives Association (ISDA) and the board of trustees for the Global Association of Risk Professionals (GARP). He is currently on the Board of the Nine Dots Prize. Previously, he was global head of market risk and global head of the Quantitative Research Team at the Royal Bank of Scotland (RBS), and sat on the Investment Committee of RBS Asset Management. He was Head of the Complex Derivatives Trading Desk and Research Group at Barclays Capital.

He holds a doctorate in nuclear engineering from Politecnico di Milano 'Leonardo da Vinci', Italy and a PhD in condensed matter physics/science of materials from Stony Brook University, NY. He was Junior Research Fellow in Physics at Corpus Christi College, Oxford (1988-1989), Post-Doctoral Fellow at the Physical Chemistry Laboratory, Oxford University (1987-1989), Visiting Scientist at the Brookhaven National Laboratory X-ray synchrotron facility (1984-1987) and Chercheur Invite' at the high-flux research nuclear reactor at the Institut Laue Langevin, Grenoble (1980-1981).

== Bibliography ==
Books authored by Rebonato include:

- How to Think About Climate Change -- . 2018. Cambridge University Press. ISBN 978-1-107-16585-4
- Bond Pricing and Yield Curve Modeling: A Structural Approach. 2018. Cambridge University Press. ISBN 978-1-107-16585-4
- Interest-Rate Option Models: Understanding, Analysing and Using Models for Exotic Interest-Rate Options. 1998. Wiley. ISBN 0-471-97958-9
- Modern Pricing of Interest-Rate Derivatives: The LIBOR Market Model and Beyond. 2002. Wiley. ISBN 0-691-08973-6
- Volatility and Correlation: The Perfect Hedger and the Fox. 2004. Wiley. ISBN 0-470-09139-8
- The SABR/LIBOR Market Model: Pricing, Calibration and Hedging for Complex Interest-Rate Derivatives. 2009. Wiley. ISBN 0-470-74005-1
- Plight of the Fortune Tellers: Why We Need to Manage Financial Risk Differently. 2007. Princeton University Press. ISBN 0-691-14817-1
- Coherent Stress Testing: A Bayesian Approach to the Analysis of Financial Stress. 2010. Wiley. ISBN 0-470-66601-3
- Portfolio Management Under Stress: A Bayesian-Net Approach to Coherent Asset Allocation. 2013. Cambridge University Press. ISBN 978-1-107-04811-9
- Bond Pricing and Yield Curve Modelling: A Structural Approach. 2013. Cambridge University Press. ISBN 978-1-107-16585-4
