= The Journal of Credit Risk =

The Journal of Credit Risk is a quarterly peer-reviewed academic journal covering the measurement and management of credit risk, including the valuation and hedging of credit products and credit risk theory and practice. It was established in 2005 and is published by Incisive Risk Information. The editors-in-chief are Ashish Dev and Michael Gordy (Federal Reserve Board). According to the Journal Citation Reports, the journal has a 2015 impact factor of 0.258.
