= Damiano Brigo =

Mathematician

Damiano Brigo (born Venice, Italy 1966) is a mathematician known for research in mathematical finance, filtering theory, stochastic analysis with differential geometry, probability theory and statistics, authoring more than 130 research publications and three monographs. From 2012 he serves as full professor with a chair in mathematical finance at the Department of Mathematics of Imperial College London, where he headed the Mathematical Finance group in 2012–2019. He is also a well known quantitative finance researcher, manager and advisor in the industry. His research has been cited and published also in mainstream industry publications, including Risk Magazine, where he has been the most cited author in the twenty years 1998–2017. He is often requested as a plenary or invited speaker both at academic and industry international events. Brigo's research has also been used in court as support for legal proceedings.

== Education and career ==
Brigo studied for a laurea degree in mathematics at the University of Padua, where he graduated cum laude with a dissertation on the nonlinear filtering problem under the supervision of Giovanni Battista Di Masi. Brigo continued his studies with a Ph.D. under the primary supervision of Bernard Hanzon at the Free University of Amsterdam, with periods under the supervision of Francois Le Gland at IRISA/INRIA in Rennes, France, with the oversight of Jan van Schuppen at CWI in Amsterdam, with a dissertation that introduced and studied the projection filters. After his PhD, Brigo pursued a career in the financial industry with several subsequent roles, first as a quantitative analyst in Banca Intesa in Milan, then as head of credit models in Banca IMI in London, and finally as a managing director with Fitch Ratings in London. While in the industry, Brigo had been appointed as external fixed income professor at Bocconi University and as a visiting professor at the Department of Mathematics at Imperial College London. By then a well known researcher and manager in the financial industry, Brigo moved to a full time academic career, starting with the Gilbart Chair full professorship in Financial Mathematics at King's College London (2010–2012), where he headed the financial mathematics group. In 2012 Brigo moved to a full professor position at the Department of Mathematics of Imperial College London, where he headed the group in 2012-2019 and where he still serves as chair in mathematical finance, while continuing advisory work in the financial industry, serving in the academic advisory board of several financial institutions, and as director of two industry research institutes in two subsequent periods in 2012–2017, being often invited as a speaker both at academic events and at events organized by the industry, with seminars, talks, lectures, panels and training courses for international conferences, universities, mathematical institutes, financial institutions, central banks and regulators.

Both during his run in the industry and his current work in academia, Brigo has been publishing academic and industry research. His joint monograph on interest rate models with Fabio Mercurio, Brigo and Mercurio (2006) has been cited more than 3000 times as per Google Scholar and has been widely adopted by academics and practitioners, the 2001 first edition being already considered a standard reference by reviewers. Brigo also authored press columns and articles for The Banker and Risk Magazine. Brigo has been the most cited author for the technical section of Risk Magazine in the twenty years periods 1998–2017, and his research on credit-default-swaps (CDS)-calibration has been referenced in legal proceedings. More in detail, in 2011 the court of law in Novara, Italy, retried a case of financial intermediation after the bankruptcy of Lehman. The judgement explanation refers to Brigo's research article on credit calibration, which was an early online preprint version of Brigo, Morini and Tarenghi (2011), using their first passage firm-value models AT1P and SBTV to calibrate Lehman's CDS data, following an earlier application to Parmalat data. The court sentence states that "... in a recent study two different mathematical models (AT1P and SBTV) have been applied to the CDS trend of Lehman, and this shows that, despite a worsening of the estimate, even from a mathematical point of view, based on the CDS patterns, the survival probability of Lehman, even near the default event, was still high."

== Research on nonlinear filtering: projection filters ==
Brigo started his research work with the development and study of the projection filters, during his Ph.D. with Bernard Hanzon and Francois Le Gland, published mainly in Brigo, Hanzon and Le Gland (1998, 1999). This initial version of projection filters was investigated by the Swedish Defense Research Agency. The projection filters are nonlinear filters based on the differential geometric approach to statistics, also related to information geometry. This work was part of Brigo's Ph.D. studies, appearing in his Ph.D. dissertation "Filtering by projection on the manifold of exponential densities".

Projection filters approximate the stochastic partial differential equation (SPDE) of the optimal nonlinear filter, evolving in an infinite dimensional space, with a finite dimensional stochastic differential equation obtained via projection of the SPDE on a chosen finite dimensional manifold of probability densities. Brigo and co-authors considered different types of optimality criteria and metrics, leading to a variety of projection filters (besides the initial references, see in particular Armstrong and Brigo (2016), and Armstrong, Brigo and Rossi Ferrucci (2021)). Projection filters have been applied to several areas, including navigation, ocean dynamics, quantum optics and quantum systems, estimation of fiber diameters, estimation of chaotic time series, change point detection and other areas, with the relevant references listed in the related projection filters page applications.

== Research on mathematical finance ==
Mathematical finance is the research area where Brigo has been most active and is most known, both in academia and industry, authoring three monographs and about one hundred academic and industry publications.

=== Interest rate derivatives models ===
Brigo and co-authors published several research papers on interest rate modeling, culminating in the monograph Brigo and Mercurio (2006) where the theory and practice of interest rate modelling are developed, including inflation modeling, credit risk modeling, early treatment of credit valuation adjustments and calibration of models to market data. The monograph collects a good part of the earlier published research by the two authors and further co-authors.

=== Volatility smile modeling ===
In volatility smile modelling, Brigo and co-authors have introduced stochastic differential equations that are consistent with dynamical mixture models, both in a univariate setting in Brigo and Mercurio (2002) and Brigo, Mercurio and Sartorelli (2003), among others, and in a multivariate setting, allowing for reconciling single assets and index volatility smiles or triangulation of FX rates smiles, in Brigo, Rapisarda and Sridi (2018) and Brigo, Pisani and Rapisarda (2021). These mixture dynamics models have been successfully applied to different asset classes, see the specific entry for further references.

=== Credit derivatives and dynamic loss models ===
From 2002, Brigo contributed also to credit derivatives modeling and counterparty credit risk valuation. Brigo and co-authors worked extensively on credit default swap and credit default options in particular, both for single name default options in Brigo (2005), Brigo and Alfonsi (2005), Brigo and El-Bachir (2010), and for credit default index options in Brigo and Morini (2011), showing how one could properly include a systemic default event in the valuation and clarifying the role of information in the valuation. Brigo was also among the first to publish a method for valuation of constant maturity credit default swaps, a form of credit default swaps where the premium leg does not pay a fixed and pre-agreed amount but a floating spread from a reference vanilla CDS over a constant time to maturity, see Brigo (2006) and the related entry. Brigo focused also on multiname credit derivatives, showing in Brigo, Pallavicini and Torresetti (2007), through a dynamic loss model, how data implied a non-negligible probability that several names defaulted together, showing some large default clusters and a concrete risk of high losses in collateralized debt obligations prior to the 2008 financial crisis. This research has been updated in 2010, leading to the monograph Credit Models and the Crisis: A journey into CDOs, Copulas, Correlations and Dynamic Models by Brigo, Pallavicini and Torresetti (2010), where, besides the dynamic loss models, the authors show research published before the crisis in 2006, highlighting the problems of the implied and base correlation paradigms that were dominating the valuation of credit index tranches at the time, based on the Gaussian copula, including the impossibility to match specific tranche spread patterns and the issue of allowing for negative expected tranched losses that pointed at possible arbitrage, see for example Torresetti, Brigo and Pallavicini (2006).

=== Valuation adjustments, XVA and nonlinear valuation ===
Brigo worked extensively on the theory and practice of valuation adjustments with several co-authors, being among the first in introducing early counterparty risk pricing calculations (later called credit valuation adjustment - CVA) in Brigo and Masetti (2006), and then focusing early on wrong way risk for CVA, see for example Brigo and Pallavicini (2007), and later on Brigo, Capponi and Pallavicini (2014) for the case of wrong way risk with credit default swaps, where the underlying itself is default risky and default correlation plays a key role, highlighting the issue that even daily collateralization may not protect enough from losses, especially under default contagion, thus anticipating the discussion on initial margins. Brigo and co-authors were also among the first to introduce rigorously the debit valuation adjustment (DVA), while a volume on the updated nonlinear theory of valuation, including credit effects, collateral modeling and funding costs, has appeared in Brigo, Morini and Pallavicini (2013), a volume that also collects investigation of wrong way risk across asset classes and collects earlier research of the authors on collateral modeling and funding costs. Still on wrong way risk, Brigo and Vrins (2018) resort to a change of probability measure as a possible explanatory and computational technique. The research in this area expanded with several articles that contributed to give full mathematical rigor to the theory of credit and funding valuation adjustments, and to show their limits, highlighting the need for a full nonlinear valuation framework. These works include Brigo and Pallavicini (2014), who highlight the necessity of initial margin and the inherent nonlinear nature of the valuation problem under credit, collateral and funding effects, sketching the derivation of a valuation equation using advanced mathematical tools that will be made fully rigorous in subsequent papers. This research continued with Brigo, Buescu, and Rutkowski (2017), reconciling credit and funding effects with a basic option pricing theory, Brigo, Francischello and Pallavicini (2019) for a fully rigorous analysis of valuation as a fully nonlinear problem expressed mathematically through backward stochastic differential equations and semi-linear partial differential equations, and Brigo, Buescu, Francischello, Pallavicini and Rutkowski (2022) to reconcile the mathematically rigorous results on nonlinear valuation and valuation adjustments based on cash flows adjustments with an approach based on hedging.

=== Pathwise finance: option pricing and optimal execution ===
Brigo and co-authors further approached mathematical finance in general from a pathwise point of view, trying to establish results independently of the probabilistic setting. Armstrong, Bellani, Brigo and Cass (2021) show how to obtain option prices without probability theory, using rough paths techniques. This approach originated from an early result of Brigo and Mercurio (2000), where it is established that given an arbitrarily fine pre-assigned trading time grid, two statistically indistinguishable models in the grid can generate arbitrarily different options prices. For pathwise finance in optimal trade execution, Bellani and Brigo (2022) show how one can do optimal execution in a model agnostic way, introducing the notion of good execution. Still in the context of optimal execution but with probability theory fully back in the framework, Brigo, Graceffa and Neumann (2022) show how to combine the theories of price impact, related to optimal execution, with the theory of the term structure of interest rates.

=== Risk measures and excessive tail-risk-seeking traders ===
In the research area of risk management and risk measures in particular, Armstrong and Brigo (2019, 2022) show that, under the S-shaped utility of Kahneman and Tversky, which can be used to model excessively tail risk seeking traders, or limited liability traders, static risk constraints based on value at risk or expected shortfall as risk measures are ineffective in curbing the potentially rogue trader utility maximization. The broad regulatory implications of this research were discussed in The Banker, Bracken Column, May 1, 2018.

=== Machine learning and RPA for credit risk and insurance ===
In the area of machine learning and artificial intelligence applied to mathematical finance, and retail credit risk in particular, non-performing loans are examined in Bellotti, Brigo, Gambetti and Vrins (2021) who approach prediction of recovery rates with machine learning. In insurance, Lamberton, Brigo and Hoy (2017) show how robotic process automation and artificial intelligence may be deployed to enhance performances in the insurance industry.

== Research on stochastic analysis and geometry, probability and statistics ==
=== Stochastic differential equations on manifolds ===
Brigo has been researching several areas of probability theory and statistics. His main work concerns the interaction of stochastic differential equations (SDEs) with the geometry of manifolds. Initially, this research has been applied to filtering, although later on, with the help of several co-authors, it has been studied in its own right and has been applied to finance too. One of the main results is the interpretation of Ito SDEs as 2-jets. This interpretation is related to Schwartz morphism and was developed in Armstrong and Brigo (2018) via the structure of jet bundles, with applications to filtering for both ordinary and quantum systems. Indeed, this work has inspired the optimal approximation of SDEs on submanifolds in Armstrong, Brigo and Rossi Ferrucci (2021) with applications leading to the latest family of projection filters based on the Ito-vector and Ito-jet projections. In a similar vein, and with rough differential equations in mind, the study of non-geometric rough paths on manifolds has been approached in Armstrong, Brigo, Cass and Rossi Ferrucci (2022).

=== SDEs with uniform distributions: peacocks ===
Still in the context of the theory of SDEs but without geometry, Brigo and co-authors worked on the theory of specific stochastic processes known as Peacocks in Brigo, Jeanblanc and Vrins (2020), linking them with Stochastic Differential Equations whose solutions are uniformly distributed. These SDEs have to be analyzed with particular care as they have time-dependent non-Lipschitz and degenerate coefficients.

=== Probability and statistical distributions ===
In probability and statistics, and in the theory of statistical distributions in particular, Alfonsi and Brigo (2005) have introduced new families of multivariate distributions through the concept of periodic copula function. Brigo, Mai and Scherer (2016) propose a new characterization of the Marshall-Olkin distribution. This is based on survival indicators of a related Markov chain and is applied to credit risk.

== Selected publications ==
=== Selected publications in nonlinear filtering ===
- Brigo, D, Hanzon, B, LeGland, F. (1998). A differential geometric approach to nonlinear filtering: The projection filter, IEEE T AUTOMAT CONTR, 1998, Vol: 43, Pages: 247 - 252, ISSN 0018-9286
- Brigo, D, Hanzon, B, Le Gland, F. (1999). Approximate nonlinear filtering by projection on exponential manifolds of densities, BERNOULLI, 1999, Vol: 5, Pages: 495 - 534, ISSN 1350-7265
- Brigo, D. (1999). Diffusion Processes, Manifolds of Exponential Densities, and Nonlinear Filtering, In: Ole E. Barndorff-Nielsen and Eva B. Vedel Jensen, editor, Geometry in Present Day Science, World Scientific, 1999.
- Armstrong, J, and Brigo, D. (2016). Nonlinear filtering via stochastic PDE projection on mixture manifolds in L2 direct metric, Mathematics of Control, Signals and Systems 28(1), Pages: 1-33.
- Armstrong, J, Brigo, D, and Hanzon, B. (2023). Optimal projection filters with information geometry. Info. Geo. (2023). https://doi.org/10.1007/s41884-023-00108-x

=== Selected monographs in mathematical finance ===
- Brigo, D, Mercurio, F. (2006). Interest Rate Models: Theory and Practice - with Smile, Inflation and Credit, Heidelberg, Springer Verlag, 2001, 2nd Edition 2006.
- Brigo, D, Pallavicini, A, and Torresetti, R. (2010). Credit Models and the Crisis: A Journey into CDOs, Copulas, Correlations and Dynamic Models. Wiley, 2010.
- Brigo, D, Morini, M., and Pallavicini, A. (2013). Counterparty Credit Risk, Collateral and Funding, with Pricing Cases for All Asset Classes. Wiley, 2013.

=== Selected publications in mathematical finance ===
- Damiano Brigo and Fabio Mercurio (2000). Option Pricing Impact of Alternative Continuous Time Dynamics for Discretely Observed Stock Prices, Finance and Stochastics, Vol. 4 issue 2, pages 147–159. https://doi.org/10.1007/s007800050009
- Brigo, D. and Mercurio, F. (2001). A deterministic–shift extension of analytically–tractable and time–homogeneous short–rate models. Finance and Stochastics 5, 369–387. https://doi.org/10.1007/PL00013541
- Brigo, D, Mercurio, F. (2002). Lognormal-mixture dynamics and calibration to market volatility smiles, International Journal of Theoretical and Applied Finance, 2002, Vol: 5, Pages: 427 - 446
- Brigo, D, Mercurio, F, Sartorelli, G. (2003). Alternative asset-price dynamics and volatility smile, QUANT FINANC, 2003, Vol: 3, Pages: 173 - 183, ISSN 1469-7688
- Brigo, D. (2005). Market Models for CDS Options and Callable Floaters, Risk Magazine, January 2005 issue
- Brigo, D, Alfonsi, A. (2005). Credit default swap calibration and derivatives pricing with the SSRD stochastic intensity model, FINANC STOCH, 2005, Vol: 9, Pages: 29 - 42, ISSN 0949-2984
- Brigo, D. (2006). Constant Maturity CDS valuation with market models. Risk Magazine, June 2006 issue. Related 2004 SSRN preprint available here.
- Brigo, D., and Masetti, M. (2006). Risk Neutral Pricing of Counterparty Risk. Chapter 11 In: Pykhtin, M. (Editor), Counterparty Credit Risk Modelling: Risk Management, Pricing and Regulation (2006). Risk Books, London.
- Torresetti, Brigo and Pallavicini (2006). Implied Correlation in CDO tranches: A Paradigm to be handled with care. SSRN working paper, http://dx.doi.org/10.2139/ssrn.946755
- Brigo, D., Pallavicini, A. (2007). Counterparty Risk under Correlation between Default and Interest Rates. In: Miller, J., Edelman, D., and Appleby, J. (Editors), Numerical Methods for Finance, Chapman Hall.
- Brigo, D, Pallavicini, A, Torresetti, R. (2007). Cluster-based extension of the generalized poisson loss dynamics andconsistency with single names, International Journal of Theoretical and Applied Finance, Vol: 10
- Brigo, D, El-Bachir, N. (2010). An exact formula for default swaptions pricing in the SSRJD stochastic intensity model, Mathematical Finance, July 2010, pp. 365–382, https://doi.org/10.1111/j.1467-9965.2010.00401.x
- Brigo, D and Morini, M. (2011). No-Armageddon Arbitrage-free Equivalent Measure for Index options in a credit crisis. Mathematical Finance, Vol. 21, Issue 4, pp. 573–593.
- Brigo, D., Morini, M. and Tarenghi, M. (2011). Credit calibration with structural models and equity return swap valuation under counterparty risk. In: Bielecki, Brigo and Patras (Editors), Credit Risk Frontiers: Subprime crisis, Pricing and Hedging, CVA, MBS, Ratings and Liquidity, Wiley/Bloomberg Press, 457–484, 2011. DOI: 10.1002/9781118531839.ch14
- Brigo, D., Capponi, A., and Pallavicini, A. (2014). Arbitrage-free bilateral counterparty risk valuation under collateralization and application to Credit Default Swaps. Mathematical Finance, Vol. 24, No. 1, pages 125–146. https://doi.org/10.1111/j.1467-9965.2012.00520.x
- Brigo, D., and Pallavicini, A. (2014). Nonlinear consistent valuation of CCP cleared or CSA bilateral trades with initial margins under credit, funding and wrong-way risks. International Journal of Financial Engineering 1 (01), https://doi.org/10.1142/S2345768614500019
- Brigo, D., Buescu, C., and Rutkowski, M. (2017). Funding, repo and credit inclusive valuation as modified option pricing. OPERATIONS RESEARCH LETTERS, 45(6), pages 665–670. doi:10.1016/j.orl.2017.10.009
- Chris Lamberton, Damiano Brigo and Dave Hoy (2017). Impact of Robotics, RPA and AI on the insurance industry: challenges and opportunities. Journal of Financial Perspectives, Volume 4, issue 1, pp. 8–20.
- Brigo, D., Rapisarda, F., and Sridi, A. (2018). The multivariate mixture dynamics: Consistent no-arbitrage single-asset and index volatility smiles. IISE TRANSACTIONS, 50(1), 27–44. doi:10.1080/24725854.2017.1374581
- Brigo, D., and Vrins, Frederic (2018). Disentangling wrong-way risk: pricing credit valuation adjustment via change of measures. European Journal of Operational Research 269(3), Pages 1154–1164, https://doi.org/10.1016/j.ejor.2018.03.015
- John Armstrong and Damiano Brigo (2019). Risk managing tail-risk seekers: VaR and expected shortfall vs S-shaped utility. Journal of Banking & Finance, Vol: 101, Pages: 122–135, https://doi.org/10.1016/j.jbankfin.2019.01.010
- Brigo D., Francischello M., Pallavicini A. (2019). Nonlinear valuation under credit, funding, and margins: existence, uniqueness, invariance, and disentanglement. European Journal of Operational Research, Vol: 274, Pages: 788–805
- Bellani, C. and Brigo, D. (2020). Mechanics of good trade execution in the framework of linear temporary market impact. Quantitative Finance, Vol: 21, Pages: 143–163
- John Armstrong, Claudio Bellani, Damiano Brigo and Thomas Cass (2021). Option pricing models without probability: a rough paths approach. Mathematical Finance, vol. 31, pages 1494–1521, https://doi.org/10.1111/mafi.12308
- Anthony Bellotti, Damiano Brigo, Paolo Gambetti and Frederic Vrins (2021). Forecasting recovery rates on nonperforming loans with machine learning. International Journal of Forecasting, Vol: 37, Pages: 428–444, https://doi.org/10.1016/j.ijforecast.2020.06.009
- Brigo, D., Pisani, C. and Rapisarda, F. (2021). The multivariate mixture dynamics model: shifted dynamics and correlation skew. Ann Oper Res 299, 1411–1435. https://doi.org/10.1007/s10479-019-03239-6
- John Armstrong and Damiano Brigo (2022). Coherent risk measures alone are ineffective in constraining portfolio losses. Journal of Banking & Finance, Vol. 140. https://doi.org/10.1016/j.jbankfin.2021.106315
- Brigo, D., Buescu, C., Francischello, M., Pallavicini, A. and Rutkowski, M. (2022). Nonlinear Valuation with XVAs: Two Converging Approaches. Mathematics 10(5), https://doi.org/10.3390/math10050791
- Brigo, D., Graceffa, F. and Neuman, E. (2022). Price impact on term structure. Quantitative Finance, 22(1), pages 171–195, doi: 10.1080/14697688.2021.1983201

=== Selected publications in stochastic analysis with differential geometry, probability and statistics ===
- Alfonsi, A, Brigo, D. (2005). New families of copulas based on periodic functions, COMMUN STAT-THEOR M, 2005, Vol: 34, Pages: 1437 - 1447, ISSN 0361-0926
- Armstrong, J and Brigo, D. (2018). Intrinsic stochastic differential equations as jets. Proceedings of the Royal Society A - Mathematical physical and engineering sciences, 474(2210), 28 pages. doi:10.1098/rspa.2017.0559.
- Brigo, D., Jeanblanc, M. and Vrins, F. (2020). SDEs with uniform distributions: Peacocks, conic martingales and mean reverting uniform diffusions. Stochastic Processes and their Applications, Vol: 130, Pages: 3895–3919. https://doi.org/10.1016/j.spa.2019.11.003
- Armstrong, J, Brigo, D, and Rossi Ferrucci, E. (2021), Optimal approximation of SDEs on submanifolds: the Ito-vector and Ito-jet projections, Proceedings of the London Mathematical Society 119(1), pages 176–213, https://doi.org/10.1112/plms.12226
- Armstrong, J, Brigo, D, Cass, T and Rossi Ferrucci, E. (2022). Non-geometric rough paths on manifolds. Journal of the London Mathematical Society, Vol. 106, issue 2, pages 756–817, https://doi.org/10.1112/jlms.12585
