= John C. Hull (economist) =

Canadian economist

- Born: 5 March 1946
- Died: 31 January 2026 (aged 79)
- Education: Cranfield University, England (PhD); Lancaster University, England (MA); Cambridge University, England (BA & MA)
- Known for: Hull-White model Options related publications
- Awards: 1999, IAFE Financial Engineer of the Year
- Scientific career
- Fields: Finance; Financial Engineering; Mathematical Finance; Derivatives; Risk Management
- Workplaces: University of Toronto, Canada; York University, Canada; Cranfield School of Management, England

John C. Hull was a professor of Derivatives and Risk Management at the Rotman School of Management at the University of Toronto.

He was a respected researcher in the academic field of quantitative finance (see for example the Hull-White model) and the author of two books on financial derivatives that are widely used texts for market practitioners: "Options, Futures, and Other Derivatives" and "Fundamentals of Futures and Options Markets". He had also written "Risk Management and Financial Institutions" and "Machine Learning in Business: An Introduction to the World of Data Science"

He studied mathematics at Cambridge University (B.A. & M.A.), and held an M.A. in Operational Research from Lancaster University and a Ph.D. in Finance from Cranfield University. In 2016, Hull was appointed University Professor, the University of Toronto's highest academic rank, recognizing unusual scholarly achievement and pre-eminence in a particular field. In 1999, he was awarded the Financial Engineer of the Year Award, by the International Association of Financial Engineers. He had also won many teaching awards, such as the University of Toronto's prestigious Northrop Frye award.

He had twin sons named Peter and David, and a wife named Michelle.

== Selected publications ==
- A Neural Network Approach to Understanding Implied Volatility Movements" Quantitative Finance, 2020, forthcoming (with Jay Cao and Jacky Chen)
- Funding Long Shots" Journal of Investment Management, 17, 4, 2019 : 1-33 (with Andrew Lo and Roger Stein)
- Interest Rate Trees: Extensions and Applications, Quantitative Finance, 18, 7 (2018): 1199-1209 (with Alan White)
- Optimal Delta Hedging for Options, Journal of Banking and Finance, 82 (Sept 2017): 180-190 (with Alan White)
- A Generalized Procedure for Building Trees for the Short Rate and its Application to Determining Market Implied Volatility Functions, Quantitative Finance, 15,3 (2015): 443-454 (with Alan White)
- Collateral and Credit Issues in Derivatives Pricing, Journal of Credit Risk, 10, 3 (2014): 3-28
- The Risk of Tranches Created from Residential Mortgages; with Alan White; Financial Analysts Journal; Issue: 66, 5; 2010; Pages: 54-67
- The Valuation of Correlation-Dependent Credit Derivatives Using a Structural Model; with Mirela Predescu, and Alan White; Journal of Credit Risk; Issue: 6, 3; 2010
- OTC Derivatives and Central Clearing: Can All Transactions Be Handled; John Hull; Financial Stability Review; Issue: July; 2010; Pages: 71-80
- An Improved Implied Copula Model and its Application to the Valuation of Bespoke CDO Tranches; with Alan White; Journal of Investment Management; Issue: 8, 3; 2010; Pages: 11-31
- the Valuation of Correlation-Dependent Credit Derivatives; John Hull, mirela Predescu, and Alan White; Journal of Credit Risk; Issue: 6 (3); 2010; Pages: 99-132
- The Credit Crunch of 2007: What Went Wrong? Why? What Lessons Can Be Learned?; John Hull; Journal of Credit Risk; Issue: 5, 2; 2009; Pages: 3-18
- Dynamic Models of Portfolio Credit Risk; with Alan White; Journal of Derivatives; Issue: 15, 4; 2008; Pages: 9-28
