= Fabio Mercurio =

Italian mathematician (born 1966)

- Born: 26 September 1966 (age 60)

Academic background
- Education: Erasmus University Rotterdam; University of Padova
- Influences: W. J. Runggaldier; A. C. F. Vorst

Academic work
- Discipline: Mathematical finance
- Institutions: Bloomberg L.P.
- Website: Information at IDEAS / RePEc

Fabio Mercurio (born 26 September 1966) is an Italian mathematician, internationally known for a number of results in mathematical finance.

== Main results ==
Mercurio worked during his Ph.D. on incomplete markets theory using dynamic mean-variance hedging techniques. With Damiano Brigo (2002–2003), he has shown how to construct stochastic differential equations consistent with mixture models, applying this to volatility smile modelling in the context of local volatility models. He is also one of the main authors in inflation modelling. Mercurio has also authored several publications in top journals and co-authored the book Interest rate models: theory and practice for Springer-Verlag, that quickly became an international reference for stochastic dynamic interest rate modelling. He is the recipient of the 2020 Risk quant-of-the-year award jointly with Andrei Lyashenko of QRM for their joint paper Lyashenko and Mercurio (2019).

== Affiliations ==
Currently, Mercurio is the global head of Quantitative Analytics at Bloomberg L.P., New York City. He holds a Ph.D. in mathematical finance from the Erasmus University in Rotterdam.

== Selected publications ==
- A. Lyashenko and F. Mercurio (2019), "Libor replacement: a modelling framework for in-arrears term rates", Risk Magazine, June 2019, recipient of the "Quant of the year" award.
- F. Mercurio and A. Pallavicini (2006), "Smiling at convexity: bridging swaption skews and CMS adjustments", Risk August, 64–69.
- F. Mercurio and N. Moreni (2006), "Inflation with a smile", Risk March, Vol. 19(3), 70–75.
- L. Bisesti, A. Castagna and F. Mercurio (2005), "Consistent Pricing and Hedging of an FX Options Book", Kyoto Economic Review 74(1), 65–83.
- F. Mercurio (2005), "Pricing Inflation-Indexed Derivatives", Quantitative Finance 5(3), 289–302.
- D. Brigo, F. Mercurio and G. Sartorelli (2003), "Alternative asset-price dynamics and volatility smile", Quantitative Finance 3(3), 173–183.
- D. Brigo and F. Mercurio (2002), "Lognormal-Mixture Dynamics and Calibration to Market Volatility Smiles", International Journal of Theoretical and Applied Finance 5(4), 427–446.
- D. Brigo and F. Mercurio (2001), "A Deterministic-Shift Extension of Analytically-Tractable and Time-Homogeneous Short-Rate Models", Finance and Stochastics 5(3), 369–387.
- F. Mercurio and J. Moraleda (2001), "A Family of Humped Volatility Models", The European Journal of Finance 7, 93–116.
- F. Mercurio (2001), "Claim Pricing and Hedging under Market Incompleteness and Mean-Variance Preferences", European Journal of Operational Research 133/3, 181–198.
- D. Brigo and F. Mercurio (2000), "Option Pricing Impact of Alternative Continuous Time Dynamics for Discretely Observed Stock Prices", Finance and Stochastics 4 (2), 147–160.
- F. Mercurio and J. Moraleda (2000), "An Analytically Tractable Interest Rate Model with Humped Volatility", European Journal of Operational Research 120/1, 205–214.
- F. Mercurio and A.C.F. Vorst (1996), "Option Pricing with Hedging at Fixed Trading Dates", Applied Mathematical Finance 3, 135–158.
- F. Mercurio and W.J. Runggaldier (1993), "Option Pricing for Jump-Diffusion: Approximations and Their Interpretation", Mathematical Finance 3, 191–200.
