= The Journal of Derivatives =

- Discipline: Finance
- Language: English
- Edited by: Joseph M. Pimbley

Publication details
- History: Since 1993
- Publisher: Portfolio Management Research
- Frequency: Quarterly
- Impact factor: 0.5 (2024)

Standard abbreviations
- ISO 4: J. Deriv.

Indexing
- ISSN: 1074-1240 (print); 2168-8524 (web)
- LCCN: 94660500
- OCLC no.: 28599438

Links
- Journal homepage

The Journal of Derivatives is a quarterly peer-reviewed academic journal covering derivatives, as well as quantitative finance and financial risk management more generally. It was established in 1993 and is published by Portfolio Management Research (PMR). Its editor-in-chief is Joseph M. Pimbley. According to the Journal Citation Reports, the journal has a 2024 impact factor of 0.5.
