= Risk (magazine) =

British trade magazine

- Categories: trade magazine
- Frequency: Monthly
- Founder: Peter Field
- Founded: 1987
- Company: Infopro Digital
- Country: United Kingdom
- Based in: London
- Language: English
- Website: www.risk.net
- ISSN: 0952-8776

Risk is an English financial industry trade magazine that specializes in financial risk management, regulation, and asset management. Since its establishment in 1987 by Peter Field, it has undergone ownership changes, transitioning from the Risk Waters Group to Incisive Media and now to Infopro Digital. The magazine's editorial team includes Kris Devasabai as editor-in-chief. Additionally, Risk organizes industry events and has a sister publication, Asia Risk. The magazine shifted to a digital-only format in June 2022 and is accessible through its website and app.

== Risk.net ==
Risk.net is a news and analysis website covering the financial industry, with a particular focus on regulation, derivatives, risk management, asset management, and commodities. Risk.net publishes widely reported stories and analytical articles.

Risk.net's financial coverage includes operational risk, accounting, Fundamental Review of the Trading Book, structured products, valuation adjustments, financial transactions risk, clearing, interest rate risk, energy, oil, gas, power, Markets in Financial Instruments Directive, liquidity risk and Solvency II.

== Risk journals ==
Risk journals deliver peer-reviewed research covering financial risk topics such as credit risk, operational risk, investment strategies, and more. Each quarter, Risk Journals publish technical papers.

Titles of the journals include: Journal of Risk, Journal of Credit Risk, Journal of Operational Risk, Journal of Financial Market Infrastructures, Journal of Computational Finance, Journal of Risk Model Validation, Journal of Energy Markets, Journal of Network Theory in Finance and Journal of Investment Strategies.

== Risk Books ==
Risk Books has been publishing and distributing specialist with books covering a wide range of technical subjects related to financial risk management for more than 20 year with over 180 different titles currently in print and digital formats.
