= Jorge Jraissati =

Venezuelan economist and policy researcher

- Born: 1996 (age 29–30); Barquisimeto, Venezuela
- Citizenship: Venezuelan
- Organization: Economic Inclusion Group

Academic background
- Education: Harriet L. Wilkes Honors College, Florida Atlantic University; IESE Business School; Harvard University

Academic work
- Discipline: Financial inclusion; Anti-money laundering; Economic development; Economy of Venezuela
- Institutions: IESE Business School; Florida Atlantic University

Jorge Jraissati (born 1996) is a Venezuelan economist, financial policy expert and policy researcher. He is the president of the Economic Inclusion Group (EIG), a United States-based 501(c)(3) nonprofit policy organisation focused on financial inclusion, debanking, economic security, transnational financial repression and the reconstruction of Venezuela. He is a research fellow at IESE Business School's Center for Public Leadership and Government and Florida Atlantic University's College of Business, and a member of the Building True Change Coalition (BTC Coalition).

His work has addressed the Venezuelan crisis, sanctions policy, authoritarian influence in Latin America, economic reconstruction, financial exclusion, the use of digital assets in politically restricted environments, and the misuse of anti-money-laundering and counter-terrorist-financing rules by authoritarian states. He has provided expertise on these issues in forums including the United States Congress, the European Parliament and the OSCE Parliamentary Assembly.

His policy recommendations have been reflected in financial-inclusion reforms and economic-security policies of the European Parliament, the OECD and the Financial Action Task Force, as well as in recommendations concerning the EU–Mercosur Partnership Agreement and documents of the Council of Europe. His analysis of the Venezuelan political crisis was quoted directly in a 2024 motion for a resolution of the Parliamentary Assembly of the Council of Europe.

== Early life and education ==
Jraissati was born in Barquisimeto, Venezuela, in 1996. He received bachelor's degrees in economics and business administration from the Harriet L. Wilkes Honors College of Florida Atlantic University. The college listed him among the 2019 recipients of its Faculty Award for Outstanding Thesis. He later earned a graduate diploma in public administration from IESE Business School, completed an economics fellowship at George Mason University, and received executive diplomas in policy and management from Stanford University and Harvard Business School. He also pursued master's-level studies in finance at Harvard University.

Jraissati became publicly active on issues related to Venezuela's economic and political crisis during the 2017 Venezuelan protests. He participated in demonstrations and spoke about the situation in Venezuela at universities and policy events in the United States, including at The Cambridge Union Society and the United Nations. His activism during the protests was profiled by HuffPost, which referred to him as the "Young Leader of the Venezuelan Fight For Freedom.". He later returned to Venezuela between 2020 and 2021, where he researched and provided commentary on the country's economic and institutional collapse.

== Policy work ==
Jraissati's policy work has centred on two related subjects: Venezuela's economic reconstruction and the wider problem of financial exclusion in democratic and authoritarian contexts. Through EIG, he has argued that access to basic financial services should be treated as an economic, civil-society and democracy issue, particularly for dissidents, exiles, nonprofit organisations and politically exposed individuals facing account closures or politically motivated financial restrictions.

His research has included work for American universities. A paper published through the University of Pittsburgh's Center for Governance and Markets examined whether environmental-compliance rules reduce investment rates in the energy and defence sectors.

Jraissati's expertise was cited in an October 2024 motion for a resolution by the Parliamentary Assembly of the Council of Europe on the situation in Venezuela and support for Venezuelans living in exile in Council of Europe member states. The motion stated that, as stressed by Jraissati, Maduro's actions would have severe consequences within and beyond Venezuela, similar to those that had led close to eight million Venezuelans to flee the country. He also participated in his capacity as president of the EIG in the 2025 Spring Meetings of the World Bank Group and the International Monetary Fund.

On 25 June 2026, Jraissati testified at a roundtable hearing convened by the Military and Foreign Affairs Subcommittee of the United States House Committee on Oversight and Government Reform. The event examined how digital assets are used by people living under repressive governments when access to banking or national currencies is restricted.

=== Venezuela ===
Jraissati's work on Venezuela has combined analysis of the causes of the country's economic collapse with research and advocacy concerning sanctions, democratic transition and post-authoritarian reconstruction. In a 2019 essay for Public Discourse, he attributed the crisis principally to the erosion of property rights and the rule of law, including expropriations, price controls and currency controls. In March 2020, he argued that informal dollarisation and the relaxation of some controls had moderated parts of the crisis without amounting to a durable economic recovery. The following month, he examined how the COVID-19 emergency and the government's control over scarce goods could strengthen the Maduro government.

His subsequent commentary connected the collapse of the state oil industry with wider institutional deterioration. In a June 2020 article for National Review, he linked domestic fuel shortages in the oil-rich country to corruption, price controls and prolonged mismanagement of PDVSA. Later that year, he wrote that cooperation between Venezuela and Iran had enabled both governments to circumvent parts of the United States' energy-sanctions regime.

In 2022, Jraissati and economist Keith Jakee published an article in Economic Affairs examining whether Venezuela's collapse was caused primarily by external shocks or domestic institutional design.

Jraissati also wrote on sanctions and the geopolitical implications of the Maduro government's survival. In The National Interest, he criticised the relaxation of United States sanctions without enforceable political concessions from the Maduro government. In an article co-authored with Robert Tyler for New Direction, he framed Venezuela as a foreign-policy and security issue for the West, arguing that the Maduro government's survival strengthened authoritarian influence from Russia, China and Iran in Latin America. In 2025, in The Wall Street Journal, he argued that Venezuela's economic collapse and migration crisis began before broad U.S. sanctions and were driven by domestic policies under Hugo Chávez and Nicolás Maduro.

In January 2026, Euractiv quoted Jraissati as arguing that the European Union risked being "long on principle and short on influence" if it failed to engage more actively with Venezuela's political transition. He described Venezuela's loss of about 70% of GDP since 2013 as the largest modern peacetime economic collapse outside a wartime context and linked the crisis to state intervention, corruption, production quotas and price controls. He also argued that any transition should restore security, political legitimacy and economic stability, including the return of confiscated property and the privatisation of industries nationalised under the Maduro and Chávez governments.

In an article for the Wilfried Martens Centre for European Studies, Jraissati similarly argued that Venezuela's reconstruction would require security, the rule of law, credible governance, the removal of price and currency controls, monetary stabilisation, reopened trade and investment, and renewed private participation in the energy sector.

He has also written and commented on the use of tokenised financial instruments in Venezuela's reconstruction. In a report covered by Bitfinex Securities and CriptoNoticias, he argued that tokenisation could help mobilise capital linked to future economic flows from sectors such as oil, gas and mining, while stressing that such tools would depend on legal certainty, property rights, custody rules, compliance mechanisms and dispute-resolution frameworks.

=== Financial inclusion and transnational repression ===
A major part of Jraissati's work has concerned the relationship between financial regulation and political repression. In a 2025 report published by EIG in partnership with the International Republican Institute, he argued that authoritarian and kleptocratic regimes can abuse global anti-money-laundering and counter-terrorist-financing systems to target opponents abroad by blocking bank accounts, freezing assets, gaining access to financial data and initiating politically motivated legal proceedings.

The report was based on interviews with more than 80 people from over 30 countries and recommended reforms including identifying high-risk jurisdictions, restricting AML/CFT cooperation with abusive regimes, creating protections for at-risk individuals, holding facilitators accountable and increasing civil-society participation in financial-regulation debates.

In June 2025, EIG and the European Endowment for Democracy published Financial Exclusion, a Hidden Crisis, a multi-author report examining barriers to financial services in the European Union. Jraissati and EIG also worked with European democracy and civil-society organisations on financial access for human-rights defenders in exile. The European Center for Not-for-Profit Law described EIG and the European Endowment for Democracy as leading an initiative on financial exclusion affecting civil-society groups in the European Union, including human-rights defenders living outside their home countries.

In 2025, as part of EIG's cooperation with the European Endowment for Democracy, Jraissati spoke at International Democracy Day in Brussels, where he warned of financial exclusion affecting civil-society organisations and proposed a "right to banking". In September 2025, he spoke at a roundtable on debanking hosted in the European Parliament by Croatian MEP Stephen Bartulica, discussing the effects of account closures on companies, nonprofit organisations, dissidents and technology businesses.

In July 2026, Jraissati participated in an expert roundtable during the 33rd Annual Session of the OSCE Parliamentary Assembly in The Hague, chaired by Italian parliamentarian Mauro Del Barba. The session addressed transnational repression by states such as China, Russia and Iran, including the misuse of financial-compliance mechanisms to freeze or terminate bank accounts. The related OSCE resolution warned that targets of transnational financial repression were not limited to civil society and could include current or former NATO and EU officials, members of parliament, judges, scientists, entrepreneurs and donors.

The proposal called on OSCE participating states, especially those involved in the Financial Action Task Force, to work toward stronger human-rights and fair-trial safeguards in FATF standards and international cooperation mechanisms. Euractiv linked the proposal to policy analyses and recommendations developed by Jraissati and EIG, while IHR Advisors described the presentation of those recommendations during the session.

In May 2026, Euractiv quoted Jraissati warning that the use of artificial intelligence in bank-compliance systems could worsen transnational financial repression because automated systems may be vulnerable to manipulation, disinformation and false accusations spread by authoritarian regimes.

=== Digital assets and freedom technology ===
Jraissati has linked his work on financial inclusion to digital assets and decentralised technologies. In an article for the Human Rights Foundation, he argued that tools such as Bitcoin, Signal and Nostr could help activists and citizens under authoritarian regimes bypass financial surveillance, account blocking, censorship and communication restrictions.

He is a member of the Building True Change Coalition, an initiative led by the Open Dialogue Foundation focused on combating financial exclusion, the misuse of AML/CFT regulations for transnational repression, and the use of Bitcoin and stablecoins in human-rights and humanitarian contexts.

The June 2026 House roundtable also examined the use of digital assets in authoritarian contexts. The committee described Jraissati as leading research on how people living under authoritarian governments use digital tools to access financial freedom. EIG has additionally partnered with the Human Rights Foundation's Bitcoin Development Fund on a project led by Jraissati to document and assist victims of financial exclusion. According to EIG, the project aims to document 100 cases involving dissidents, activists and civil-society groups cut off from financial systems.

== Public commentary ==
Jraissati has been cited or interviewed on Venezuela's political transition, sanctions, economic collapse and humanitarian crises. His commentary has appeared in or been quoted by outlets including Fox News, Fox Business, CNN, Euractiv, The Wall Street Journal, The National Interest, National Review and Reason.

In January 2026, he commented to Fox News Digital on a possible post-Maduro transition led by María Corina Machado and Edmundo González Urrutia, arguing that Machado's leadership would depend on her ability to include younger and technically capable figures. In Fox Business coverage of Venezuela's economy, he described low wages, poverty, hyperinflation, price controls, currency controls and the collapse of productive capacity as central obstacles to recovery. He also commented to Fox News on Cuba's influence in Venezuela's military and intelligence structures and the security challenges of a transition.

In the wake of the 2026 Venezuela earthquakes, he appeared on CNN Newsroom to discuss their aftermath, describing public frustration and the lack of state capacity to respond to the disaster. In interviews for NBC Palm Springs and Euronews Albania, he argued that the country lacked the functioning state capacity, financial resources and technical infrastructure needed to manage a disaster of that scale.

He has also spoken at international policy events, including the Copenhagen Democracy Summit, where he participated in a Global Democracy Coalition meeting in 2025.

== Selected publications ==
- Jraissati, Jorge; Jakee, Keith (2022). "Venezuela's collapse: Exogenous shock or institutional design?" Economic Affairs. 42 (2): 344–360. doi:10.1111/ecaf.12537.
- Jraissati, Jorge (2025). Combating Transnational Financial Repression: Evidence for Reforming AML/CFT Laws. Economic Inclusion Group and International Republican Institute.
- Jraissati, Jorge (2025). "Are Environmental Compliance Rules Reducing Investment Rates in Energy and Defense?" Center for Governance and Markets Paper No. DA1-2025. doi:10.2139/ssrn.5712024.
- Jraissati, Jorge (2024). "The Role of Freedom Tech in Venezuela's Fight for Freedom". Human Rights Foundation.
- Jraissati, Jorge (2024). "In Venezuela, Digital Freedom Is a Threat to Dictators". Reason.
- Jraissati, Jorge (2025). "To Truly Fix Debanking, We Need Structural Reforms". Reason.
- Jraissati, Jorge (2020). "Venezuela and Iran Are Circumventing American Energy Sanctions". National Review.
- Jraissati, Jorge (2023). "Biden Lifts Venezuela Sanctions for Nothing in Return". The National Interest.
- Dawson, Walter D.; Jraissati, Jorge; et al. (2022). "Investing in Late-Life Brain Capital". Innovation in Aging. 6 (3). doi:10.1093/geroni/igac016.
- Eyre, Harris A.; Jraissati, Jorge; et al. (2023). "Brain Capital is Key to a Sustainable Future". Baker Institute for Public Policy. doi:10.25613/5yez-tc65.
- Eyre, Harris A.; Jraissati, Jorge; et al. (2023). "How Brain Capital Can Drive Progress on UN's Sustainable Development Goals". Baker Institute for Public Policy. doi:10.25613/E96R-EG11.

== See also ==
- Financial inclusion
- Economy of Venezuela
- Transnational repression
- Anti-money laundering
