= Fuzzy pay-off method for real option valuation =

Application of fuzzy sets to finance

The fuzzy pay-off method for real option valuation (FPOM or pay-off method) is a method for valuing real options, developed by Mikael Collan, Robert Fullér, and József Mezei; and published in 2009. It is based on the use of fuzzy logic and fuzzy numbers for the creation of the possible pay-off distribution of a project (real option). The structure of the method is similar to the probability theory based Datar–Mathews method for real option valuation, but the method is not based on probability theory and uses fuzzy numbers and possibility theory in framing the real option valuation problem.

== Method ==
The Fuzzy pay-off method derives the real option value from a pay-off distribution that is created by using three or four cash-flow scenarios (most often created by an expert or a group of experts). The pay-off distribution is created simply by assigning each of the three cash-flow scenarios a corresponding definition with regards to a fuzzy number (triangular fuzzy number for three scenarios and a trapezoidal fuzzy number for four scenarios). This means that the pay-off distribution is created without any simulation whatsoever. This makes the procedure easy and transparent. The scenarios used are a minimum possible scenario (the lowest possible outcome), the maximum possible scenario (the highest possible outcome) and a best estimate (most likely to happen scenario) that is mapped as a fully possible scenario with a full degree of membership in the set of possible outcomes, or in the case of four scenarios used - two best estimate scenarios that are the upper and lower limit of the interval that is assigned a full degree of membership in the set of possible outcomes.

The main observations that lie behind the model for deriving the real option value are the following:

1. The fuzzy NPV of a project is (equal to) the pay-off distribution of a project value that is calculated with fuzzy numbers.
2. The mean value of the positive values of the fuzzy NPV is the "possibilistic" mean value of the positive fuzzy NPV values.
3. Real option value, ROV, calculated from the fuzzy NPV is the "possibilistic" mean value of the positive fuzzy NPV values multiplied with the positive area of the fuzzy NPV over the total area of the fuzzy NPV.

The real option formula can then be written simply as:

$$\mathrm{ROV} = \frac{A(\mathrm{Pos})}{A(\mathrm{Pos})+A(\mathrm{Neg})} \times E[A_+]$$

where A(Pos) is the area of the positive part of the fuzzy distribution, A(Neg) is the area of the negative part of the fuzzy distribution, and E[A_{+}] is the mean value of the positive part of the distribution. It can be seen that when the distribution is totally positive, the real options value reduces to the expected (mean) value, E[A_{+}].

As can be seen, the real option value can be derived directly from the fuzzy NPV, without simulation. At the same time, simulation is not an absolutely necessary step in the Datar–Mathews method, so the two methods are not very different in that respect. But what is totally different is that the Datar–Mathews method is based on probability theory and as such has a very different foundation from the pay-off method that is based on possibility theory: the way that the two models treat uncertainty is fundamentally different.

== Use of the method ==
The pay-off method for real option valuation is very easy to use compared to the other real option valuation methods and it can be used with the most commonly used spreadsheet software without any add-ins. The method is useful in analyses for decision making regarding investments that have an uncertain future, and especially so if the underlying data is in the form of cash-flow scenarios. The method is less useful if optimal timing is the objective. The method is flexible and accommodates easily both one-stage investments and multi-stage investments (compound real options).

The method has been taken into use in some large international industrial companies for the valuation of research and development projects and portfolios. In these analyses triangular fuzzy numbers are used. Other uses of the method so far are, for example, R&D project valuation IPR valuation, valuation of M&A targets and expected synergies, valuation and optimization of M&A strategies, valuation of area development (construction) projects, valuation of large industrial real investments.

The use of the pay-off method is lately taught within the larger framework of real options, for example at the Lappeenranta University of Technology and at the Tampere University of Technology in Finland.
