= Timothy Luehrman =

Timothy A. Luehrman is a finance academic, formerly a senior lecturer at Harvard Business School. He is best known for his work on valuation and real options; specifically, he conceived the idea of treating business strategy as a series of options, and his papers here are widely quoted.

His research focuses on international corporate finance, advanced valuation techniques, and long-horizon financial management. He has published numerous books, research articles and case studies for both scholars and practitioners.

He has held appointments at the MIT Sloan School of Management, IMD and the Thunderbird School of Global Management. He was also a managing director at Standard & Poor’s Corporate Value Consulting division and a partner at PricewaterhouseCoopers. During 2003–2004 he was a member of the Financial Accounting Standards Board’s Option Valuation Group.

He received his B.A. in economics from Amherst College (1979), MBA from Harvard Business School (1983), and Ph.D. in business economics from the Harvard Graduate School of Arts and Sciences (1986).
