= Economic Inclusion Group =

US-based nonprofit policy organisation

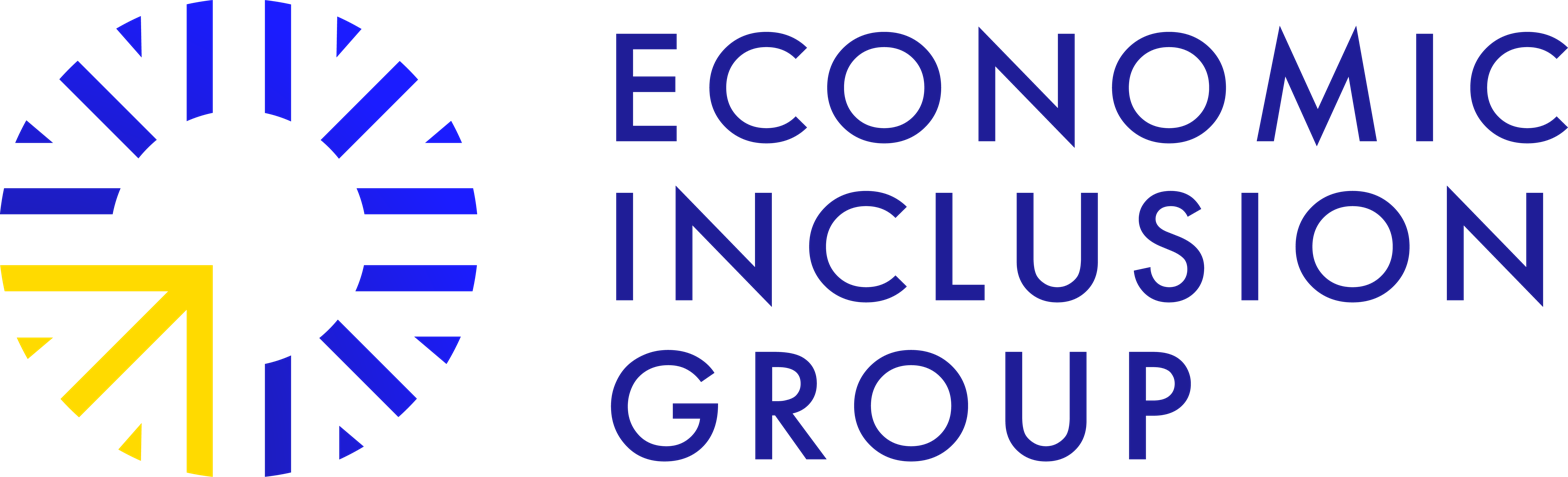
- Logo of the Economic Inclusion Group
- Abbreviation: EIG
- Formation: January 2024; 2 years ago
- Type: U.S. 501(c)(3) nonprofit policy organisation
- Headquarters: Boca Raton, Florida, United States
- Region served: Worldwide
- Fields: Financial inclusion; Debanking; Anti–money laundering; Economic security; Economy of Venezuela
- President: Jorge Jraissati
- Chairman of the Board: Luis Ball
- Board of directors: Jorge Jraissati; Luis Ball; Dan Rothschild; Keith Jakee
- Website: econinclusion.com

The Economic Inclusion Group (EIG) is a United States-based nonprofit policy organisation focused on financial inclusion, debanking, economic security, transnational financial repression and the economic reconstruction of Venezuela. Its stated mission is to protect people and businesses from debanking risks, help countries strengthen national economic security, and support Venezuela's reconstruction through policy advocacy, research and direct advising.

The organisation was established in January 2024 by a group of young leaders in policy, academia and business. EIG states that its three main areas of focus are guaranteeing a "right to banking", promoting open and competitive economies, and protecting democracies from forms of transnational financial repression. It is registered as a 501(c)(3) nonprofit organisation.

== Leadership ==
EIG is led by Venezuelan economist Jorge Jraissati, who serves as its president. Businessman Luis Ball serves as chairman of the board. Other board members listed by the organisation include Dan Rothschild, director at the Reagan Foundation, and Keith Jakee, professor of economics at Florida Atlantic University.

The organisation's advisory board includes figures from the fields of public policy, economics, philanthropy, human rights and financial regulation. Listed advisers include former U.S. State Department official Megan Anderson, investor David Thayer, Nicaraguan democracy advocate Félix Maradiaga, Ideas Beyond Borders founder Faisal Saeed Al Mutar, Cato Institute policy analyst Nicholas Anthony and Global Democracy Coalition coordinator Elisenda Ballesté Buxó.

== Research and policy agenda ==
EIG's research and advocacy focus on the relationship between financial regulation, civil society and political repression. Its publications cover subjects including debanking, anti-money-laundering and counter-terrorist-financing rules, economic competitiveness, trade policy, financial access for human-rights defenders, and Venezuela's reconstruction.

According to the Global Democracy Coalition, EIG's mission is to advance economic opportunity and financial inclusion globally, especially in the United States and the European Single Market. Its primary focus is the reform of AML/CFT regulations, which EIG argues can cause financial exclusion of immigrants, entrepreneurs and politically exposed persons, impose costs on businesses, and allow authoritarian regimes to suppress dissidents abroad by freezing accounts and surveilling personal information.

The organisation's stated areas of expertise include stopping debanking, reforming the Bank Secrecy Act, promoting financial innovation through tools such as Bitcoin and stablecoins, supporting the relaunch of Venezuela's economy, and increasing youth participation in economic policymaking.

== Financial inclusion and transnational repression ==
A central part of EIG's work concerns financial exclusion and debanking, particularly where banking-compliance rules affect civil society, migrants, politically exposed persons, entrepreneurs, humanitarian organisations and dissidents. Reason described EIG's strategic priorities as protecting people and businesses from debanking practices and from the weaponisation of financial information; it also stated that EIG helps businesses and foundations adopt crypto assets for international operations.

In 2025, EIG and the International Republican Institute published a report by Jraissati titled Combating Transnational Financial Repression: Evidence for Reforming AML/CFT Laws. The report argued that authoritarian and kleptocratic regimes can misuse AML/CFT systems to target opponents abroad by blocking bank accounts, freezing assets, gaining access to financial data and initiating politically motivated legal proceedings. The report was based on nearly 80 interviews in more than 30 countries and recommended reforms including identifying high-risk jurisdictions, restricting AML/CFT cooperation with abusive regimes, creating protections for at-risk individuals, holding facilitators accountable and increasing civil-society participation in financial-regulation debates.

The European Center for Not-for-Profit Law described EIG and the European Endowment for Democracy as leading a wider initiative on financial exclusion affecting groups in the European Union, including human rights defenders in exile. As part of EIG's cooperation with the European Endowment for Democracy, Jraissati spoke at International Democracy Day in Brussels in 2025, where he warned of financial exclusion affecting civil-society organisations and proposed a "right to banking".

In May 2026, EIG stated that the European Parliament's Committee on Foreign Affairs had incorporated its recommendations on debanking and transnational financial repression into a report on countering transnational repression. According to EIG, the report treated financial exclusion as a tool of repression when authoritarian regimes misuse financial, legal or compliance systems to punish critics abroad, and created policy hooks for safeguards against politically motivated debanking and abusive asset freezes. Euractiv also cited EIG's research in its coverage of financial repression in Europe.

In July 2026, EIG co-organised an expert roundtable on transnational financial repression during the 33rd Annual Session of the OSCE Parliamentary Assembly in The Hague. The roundtable was chaired by Italian parliamentarian Mauro Del Barba and addressed the misuse of financial-compliance mechanisms, Interpol notices and other legal tools against government critics abroad. Euractiv reported that the related OSCE proposal warned that targets of transnational financial repression were not limited to civil society but could include current or former NATO and EU officials, members of parliament, judges, scientists, entrepreneurs and donors. Jraissati told Euractiv that the OSCE proposal incorporated many of EIG's policy analyses and recommendations for the international legal and financial system, including human-rights and fair-trial safeguards in Financial Action Task Force standards.

== Digital assets and freedom technology ==
EIG has linked its financial-inclusion work to digital assets and decentralised technologies. Its expertise page states that it promotes the use of Bitcoin and stablecoins as tools for cross-border payments, humanitarian assistance and financial inclusion, especially in countries with weak banking systems, high inflation or capital controls.

EIG is connected to the Building True Change Coalition, also known as the BTC Coalition, through Jraissati, who is listed by the Open Dialogue Foundation as a coalition member. The BTC Coalition is an ODF-led initiative focused on combating misuse of AML/CFT regulations for transnational repression, promoting financial inclusion in non-democratic and developing countries, supporting the use of Bitcoin and stablecoins for human-rights and humanitarian work, and educating about Bitcoin mining and renewable energy.

In cooperation with the Human Rights Foundation, EIG has promoted what it describes as "freedom tech" in Venezuela. In an article for HRF, Jraissati argued that tools such as Bitcoin, Signal and Nostr can help activists and citizens under authoritarian regimes bypass financial surveillance, account blocking, censorship and restrictions on communication.

In 2026, the Human Rights Foundation's Bitcoin Development Fund announced support for an EIG project led by Jraissati titled Documenting, Communicating, and Protecting Victims of Financial Exclusion. The project was described as aiming to document 100 cases of dissidents cut off from financial systems worldwide and to share the stories through articles, podcasts and social media.

In June 2026, Jraissati participated in a roundtable organised by the United States House Committee on Oversight and Government Reform on digital currency and repressive foreign regimes. The committee described him as president of EIG and said that his work examined the conditions under which people turn to cryptocurrency when governments restrict banking access or weaponise currency controls.

== Venezuela ==
EIG's Venezuela-related work concerns post-authoritarian reconstruction, financial infrastructure and the use of digital tools to reconnect the country to global markets. The organisation describes one of its areas of expertise as "Re-launch the Venezuelan Economy" and says it leads Victoria Venezuela, a task force connecting young Venezuelan leaders with policymakers and business leaders to plan economic reconstruction.

In policy writings associated with EIG, Jraissati has argued that Venezuela's recovery would require not only political change or renewed oil investment, but also credible financial institutions, access to credit, savings and payment tools, property formalisation, investment guarantees, energy reform and the regulated use of digital assets.

EIG-related proposals have also included the use of tokenised financial instruments in Venezuela's reconstruction. According to a report covered by Bitfinex Securities and CriptoNoticias, tokenised rights to future revenues from productive assets such as oil, gas and mining projects could help mobilise capital before the full reconstruction of Venezuela's traditional financial system, though such tools would depend on legal certainty, property rights, custody rules, compliance mechanisms and dispute-resolution frameworks.

In a policy paper co-authored for New Direction, Jraissati and Robert Tyler framed Venezuela as a foreign-policy and security issue for Western democracies, arguing that the survival of the Maduro government strengthened authoritarian influence from Russia, China and Iran in Latin America and created a precedent for democratic backsliding elsewhere.

In 2026, the Wilfried Martens Centre for European Studies published Jraissati's article on Venezuela's post-Maduro reconstruction, in which he argued that a transition would require security, rule of law, credible governance, the removal of price and currency controls, monetary stabilisation, reopened trade and investment, and renewed private participation in the energy sector.

In January 2026, Euractiv quoted Jraissati as president of EIG and as a former adviser to U.S. government officials on Venezuela. He argued that the European Union risked being "long on principle and short on influence" if it failed to engage with a political transition in Venezuela, described the country's loss of about 70% of GDP since 2013 as the largest modern peacetime economic collapse outside a wartime context, and linked the crisis to state intervention, corruption, production quotas and price controls.

Jraissati's expertise was also cited in an October 2024 Motion for a Resolution by the Parliamentary Assembly of the Council of Europe on the situation in Venezuela and support for Venezuelans living in exile in Council of Europe member states. The motion stated that, as stressed by Jraissati, Maduro's actions would have severe consequences within and beyond Venezuela, similar to those that had led close to eight million Venezuelans to flee the country.

== United States and international work ==
EIG is active in democracy, human-rights and financial-regulation policy networks. The Copenhagen Democracy Summit 2025 listed Jraissati as a speaker and described EIG as an organisation "turning ideas into policy", with strategic priorities including financial inclusion, reducing barriers to economic participation and protecting democracies from transnational financial repression. The summit profile stated that EIG was advising policymakers and institutions in the United States and Europe.

In February 2026, Jraissati spoke at a Harvard Club of the Palm Beaches event titled "Debanking in America: Causes, Magnitude, Solutions, and Trade-Offs".

In May 2026, EIG advisory board member Nicholas Anthony testified before the United States House Committee on Financial Services Subcommittee on National Security, Illicit Finance and International Financial Institutions on Bank Secrecy Act reform. In his testimony, Anthony argued that the U.S. financial-surveillance system had expanded with limited results and weakened financial privacy.

== See also ==
- Financial inclusion
- Debanking
- Transnational repression
- Anti–money laundering
- Economy of Venezuela
