= Tokenization =

Tokenization may refer to:

- Tokenization (lexical analysis) in processing of computer languages
- Tokenization in large language models
- Tokenization in search engine indexing
- Tokenization (data security)
- Word segmentation
- A procedure during the Transformer architecture

== See also ==
- Tokenism of minorities
