= Niederreiter =

Niederreiter is a surname. Notable people with the surname include:

- Harald Niederreiter (born 1944), Austrian mathematician
- Nino Niederreiter (born 1992), Swiss ice hockey winger

== See also ==
- Niederreiter cryptosystem
