= QRNG =

QRNG may refer to:

- Quantum random number generator, a random number generator based on quantum phenomena
- Quasirandom Number Generator, a function that generates a series of numbers that fill some range in an even pattern
- Quinolone-resistant neisseria gonorrhoeae
