= Mike Giles =

British mathematician and computer scientist

- Born: 27 December 1959 (age 66)
- Education: University of Cambridge; MIT
- Known for: Multilevel Monte Carlo method
- Scientific career
- Fields: Computational fluid dynamics; Computational finance
- Workplaces: MIT; University of Oxford
- Thesis: Newton Solution of Steady Two-Dimensional Transonic Flow
- Doctoral students: Niles Pierce
- Website: www.maths.ox.ac.uk/people/mike.giles

Michael Bryce Giles (born 27 December 1959) is a British mathematician and computer scientist. He is a professor of Numerical Analysis at the Mathematical Institute, University of Oxford and a Fellow of Balliol College, Oxford. He is best known for developing Multilevel Monte Carlo methods.

== Education ==
Giles studied mathematics as an undergraduate at the University of Cambridge, graduating in 1981 as senior wrangler. He then moved to MIT as a Kennedy Scholar, where he received his PhD in aeronautics in 1985.

== Career and research ==
After obtaining his PhD, Giles became a professor in MIT's Department of Aeronautics and Astronautics. In 1992, he joined the University of Oxford's Department of Computer Science, before moving to the Mathematical Institute in 2008. He was Head of department at the Mathematical Institute from 2018 to 2023.

In the earlier part of his career, Giles worked on computational fluid dynamics applied to the analysis and design of gas turbines. More recently, he has focused on computational finance and the development of Multilevel Monte Carlo methods.

Giles was elected a Fellow of the Royal Society in 2025.
