= David Hertz =

David Hertz may refer to:

- David B. Hertz (?–2011), operations research practitioner and academic
- David Randall Hertz (born 1960), American architect, inventor and educator
