= Johannes van der Corput =

Dutch mathematician (1890–1975)

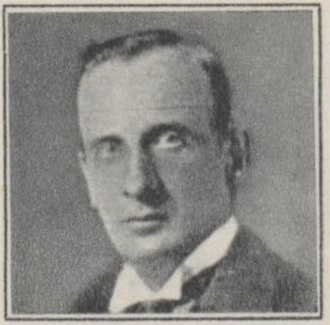
- Born: 4 September 1890; Rotterdam
- Died: 13 September 1975 (aged 85); Amsterdam
- Education: Universiteit Leiden
- Known for: Van der Corput lemma Van der Corput sequence
- Scientific career
- Fields: Mathematics
- Workplaces: University of Fribourg; University of Groningen; University of Amsterdam; University of California, Berkeley
- Doctoral students: Jurjen Koksma; Cornelis Simon Meijer

Johannes Gaultherus van der Corput (4 September 1890 – 13 September 1975) was a Dutch mathematician, working in the field of analytic number theory.

He was appointed professor at the University of Fribourg (Switzerland) in 1922, at the University of Groningen in 1923, and at the University of Amsterdam in 1946. He was one of the founders of the Mathematisch Centrum in Amsterdam, of which he also was the first director. From 1953 on, Van der Corput worked in the United States at the University of California, Berkeley, and the University of Wisconsin–Madison.

Van der Corput introduced the Van der Corput lemma, a technique for creating an upper bound on the measure of a set drawn from harmonic analysis, and the Van der Corput theorem on equidistribution modulo 1.

He became member of the Royal Netherlands Academy of Arts and Sciences in 1929, and foreign member in 1953. He was a Plenary Speaker of the ICM in 1936 in Oslo.

== See also ==
- van der Corput inequality
- van der Corput lemma (harmonic analysis)
- van der Corput's method
- van der Corput sequence
- van der Corput's theorem
