= Peter Jaeckel =

Peter Jaeckel (Peter Jäckel) is a mathematician, finance professor and market practitioner. He is the managing director of OTC Analytics. He also teaches at the Certificate of Quantitative Finance (CQF, FitchLearning) programme and at Oxford University. Previously, he was a managing director (Deputy Head of Quantitative Research) at VTB Europe (Frankfurt) and VTB Capital (London). Before that, Global Head of Credit, Hybrid, Inflation, and Commodity Derivative Analytics at ABN Amro, and also held several positions at Nikko Securities, NatWest (Royal Bank of Scotland group), and Commerzbank Securities' product development group. He is the author of the bestselling Monte Carlo methods in finance (John Wiley and Sons, ISBN 0-471-49741-X). In mathematics, he has made important contributions to the field of Sobol sequences; while in Mathematical Finance, he has been influential in the development of Monte Carlo methods in finance, and has also contributed, to the LIBOR market model, and volatility modelling. Jäckel received his D. Phil. in Physics from Oxford University in 1995.
