= Jurjen Ferdinand Koksma =

Dutch mathematician (1904–1964)

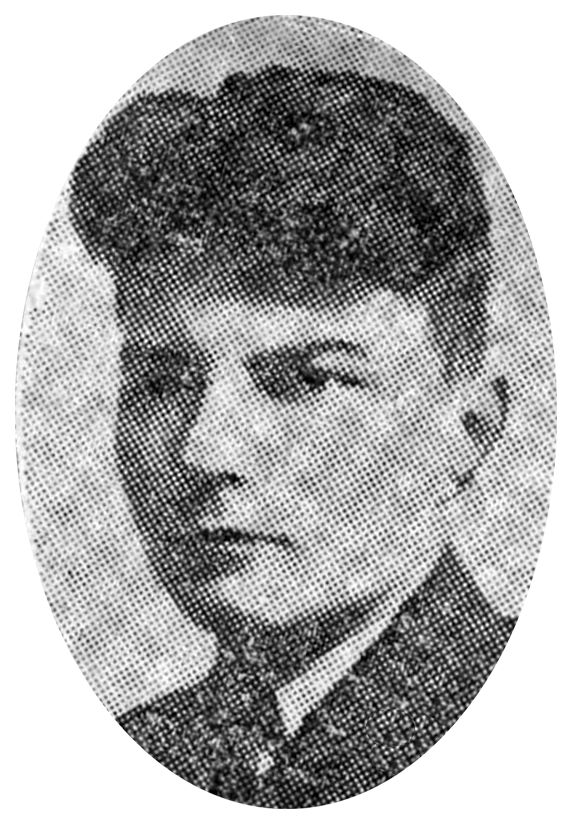
Jurjen Koksma, 1930

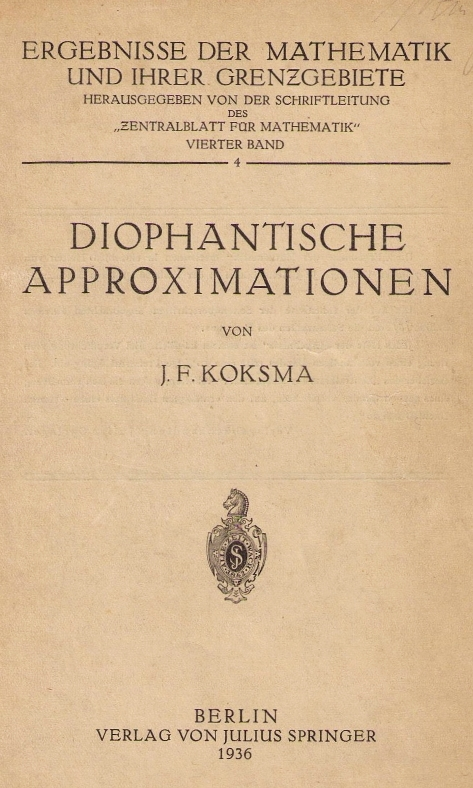
Diophantische Approximationen (1936), title page.

Jurjen Ferdinand Koksma (21 April 1904, Schoterland – 17 December 1964, Amsterdam) was a Dutch mathematician who specialized in analytic number theory.

Koksma received his Ph.D. degree (cum laude) in 1930 at the University of Groningen under supervision of Johannes van der Corput, with a thesis on Systems of Diophantine Inequalities. Around the same time, aged 26, he was invited to become full professor at the Vrije Universiteit Amsterdam. He accepted and in 1930 became the first professor in mathematics at this university. Koksma is also one of the founders of the Dutch Mathematisch Centrum (today Centrum Wiskunde & Informatica).

One of Koksma's main works was the book Diophantische Approximationen, published in 1936 by Springer. He also wrote several papers with Paul Erdős.

In 1950 he became member of the Royal Netherlands Academy of Arts and Sciences.

Koksma had two brothers, Jan and Marten, who were also mathematicians.

== See also ==
- Denjoy–Koksma inequality
- Koksma's equivalent classification
- Koksma–Hlawka inequality
- Erdős–Turán–Koksma inequality

== Literature ==
- Arie van Deursen: The distinctive character of the Free University in Amsterdam, 1880-2005, Eerdmans Publishing (2008).
