= Van der Corput sequence =

One-dimensional low-discrepancy sequence

Illustration of the filling of the unit interval (horizontal axis) using the first n terms of the decimal Van der Corput sequence, for n from 0 to 999 (vertical axis)

A van der Corput sequence is an example of the simplest one-dimensional low-discrepancy sequence over the unit interval; it was first described in 1935 by the Dutch mathematician J. G. van der Corput. It is constructed by reversing the base-n representation of the sequence of natural numbers (1, 2, 3, …).

The $b$-ary representation of the positive integer $n \geq 1$ is
$$n ~=~ \sum_{k=0}^{L-1} d_k(n) b^k ~=~ d_0(n) b^0 + \cdots + d_{L-1}(n) b^{L-1},$$
where $b$ is the base in which the number $n$ is represented, and $0 \leq d_k(n) < b;$ that is, the $k$-th digit in the $b$-ary expansion of $n.$ The $n$-th number in the van der Corput sequence is
$$g_b(n) ~=~ \sum_{k=0}^{L-1} d_k(n) b^{-k-1} ~=~ d_0(n) b^{-1} + \cdots + d_{L-1}(n) b^{-L}.$$

== Examples ==
For example, to get the decimal van der Corput sequence, we start by dividing the numbers 1 to 9 in tenths ($x/10$), then we change the denominator to 100 to begin dividing in hundredths ($x/100$). In terms of numerator, we begin with all two-digit numbers from 10 to 99, but in backwards order of digits. Consequently, we will get the numerators grouped by the end digit. Firstly, all two-digit numerators that end with 1, so the next numerators are 01, 11, 21, 31, 41, 51, 61, 71, 81, 91. Then the numerators ending with 2, so they are 02, 12, 22, 32, 42, 52, 62, 72, 82, 92. And after that, the numerators ending in 3: 03, 13, 23 and so on...

Thus, the sequence begins
$$\left\{ \tfrac{1}{10}, \tfrac{2}{10}, \tfrac{3}{10}, \tfrac{4}{10}, \tfrac{5}{10}, \tfrac{6}{10}, \tfrac{7}{10}, \tfrac{8}{10}, \tfrac{9}{10}, \tfrac{1}{100}, \tfrac{11}{100}, \tfrac{21}{100}, \tfrac{31}{100}, \tfrac{41}{100}, \tfrac{51}{100}, \tfrac{61}{100}, \tfrac{71}{100}, \tfrac{81}{100}, \tfrac{91}{100}, \tfrac{2}{100}, \tfrac{12}{100}, \tfrac{22}{100}, \tfrac{32}{100}, \ldots \right\},$$
or in decimal representation:

0.1, 0.2, 0.3, 0.4, 0.5, 0.6, 0.7, 0.8, 0.9, 0.01, 0.11, 0.21, 0.31, 0.41, 0.51, 0.61, 0.71, 0.81, 0.91, 0.02, 0.12, 0.22, 0.32, …,

The same can be done for the binary numeral system, and the binary van der Corput sequence is

0.1_{2}, 0.01_{2}, 0.11_{2}, 0.001_{2}, 0.101_{2}, 0.011_{2}, 0.111_{2}, 0.0001_{2}, 0.1001_{2}, 0.0101_{2}, 0.1101_{2}, 0.0011_{2}, 0.1011_{2}, 0.0111_{2}, 0.1111_{2}, …

or, equivalently,
$$\tfrac{1}{2}, \tfrac{1}{4}, \tfrac{3}{4}, \tfrac{1}{8}, \tfrac{5}{8}, \tfrac{3}{8}, \tfrac{7}{8}, \tfrac{1}{16}, \tfrac{9}{16}, \tfrac{5}{16}, \tfrac{13}{16}, \tfrac{3}{16}, \tfrac{11}{16}, \tfrac{7}{16}, \tfrac{15}{16}, \ldots.$$

The elements of the van der Corput sequence (in any base) form a dense set in the unit interval; that is, for any real number in $[0, 1]$, there exists a subsequence of the van der Corput sequence that converges to that number. They are also equidistributed over the unit interval.

== Python implementation ==
def corput(n, base: int) -> float:
    """
    Returns the n-th element of the van der Corput sequence in a given base
    """
    output = 0.0
    output_increment = 1 / base
    while n > 0:
        # process the least significant digit of the sequence position n
        # to get the most significant digit of the output
        least_significant_digit = n % base
        output += least_significant_digit * output_increment

        # remove the least significant digit of the sequence position
        n //= base
        # move the output_increment to the next digit
        output_increment /= base
    return output

== See also ==
- Bit-reversal permutation – Permutation that reverses binary numbers
- Constructions of low-discrepancy sequences – Type of mathematical sequence
- Halton sequence – Type of numeric sequence used in statistics, a natural generalization of the van der Corput sequence to higher dimensions
