= Van der Corput lemma (harmonic analysis) =

In mathematics, in the field of harmonic analysis, the van der Corput lemma is an estimate for oscillatory integrals named after the Dutch mathematician J. G. van der Corput.

The following result is stated by E. Stein:

Suppose that a real-valued function $\phi(x)$ is smooth in an open interval $(a, b)$, and that $|\phi^{(k)}(x)|\ge 1$ for all $x \in (a, b)$. Assume that either $k \ge 2$, or that $k = 1$ and $\phi'(x)$ is monotone for $x \in \R$. Then there is a constant $c_k$, which does not depend on $\phi$, such that

$$\bigg|\int_a^b e^{i\lambda\phi(x)}\;\mathrm{d}x\bigg| \le c_k\lambda^{-1/k}$$

for any $\lambda \in \R$.

== Sublevel set estimates ==
The van der Corput lemma is closely related to the sublevel set estimates, which give the upper bound on the measure of the set where a function takes values not larger than $\epsilon$.

Suppose that a real-valued function $\phi(x)$ is smooth on a finite or infinite interval $I \subset \R$, and that $|\phi^{(k)}(x)| \ge 1$ for all $x \in I$. There is a constant $c_k$, which does not depend on $\phi$, such that for any $\epsilon \ge 0$ the measure of the sublevel set $\{x \in I: |\phi(x)| \le \epsilon\}$ is bounded by $c_k\epsilon^{1/k}$.
