= Oscillatory integral =

Type of distribution in mathematical analysis

In mathematical analysis an oscillatory integral is a type of distribution. Oscillatory integrals make rigorous many arguments that, on a naive level, appear to use divergent integrals. It is possible to represent approximate solution operators for many differential equations as oscillatory integrals.

== Definition ==
An oscillatory integral $f(x)$ is written formally as

$$f(x) = \int e^{i \phi(x, \xi)}\, a(x, \xi) \, \mathrm{d}\xi,$$

where $\phi(x, \xi)$ and $a(x, \xi)$ are functions defined on $\mathbb{R}_x^n \times \mathrm{R}^N_\xi$ with the following properties:

1. The function $\phi$ is real-valued, positive-homogeneous of degree 1, and infinitely differentiable away from $\{\xi = 0\}$. Also, we assume that $\phi$ does not have any critical points on the support of $a$. Such a function, $\phi$ is usually called a phase function. In some contexts more general functions are considered and still referred to as phase functions.
2. The function $a$ belongs to one of the symbol classes $S^m_{1,0}(\mathbb{R}_x^n \times \mathrm{R}^N_\xi)$ for some $m \in \mathbb{R}$. Intuitively, these symbol classes generalize the notion of positively homogeneous functions of degree $m$. As with the phase function $\phi$, in some cases the function $a$ is taken to be in more general, or just different, classes.

When $m < -N$, the formal integral defining $f(x)$ converges for all $x$, and there is no need for any further discussion of the definition of $f(x)$. However, when $m \geq -N$, the oscillatory integral is still defined as a distribution on $\mathbb{R}^n$, even though the integral may not converge. In this case the distribution $f(x)$ is defined by using the fact that $a(x, \xi) \in S^m_{1,0}(\mathbb{R}_x^n \times \mathrm{R}^N_\xi)$ may be approximated by functions that have exponential decay in $\xi$. One possible way to do this is by setting

$$f(x) = \lim\limits_{\epsilon \to 0^+} \int e^{i \phi(x, \xi)}\, a(x, \xi) e^{-\epsilon |\xi|^2/2} \, \mathrm{d}\xi,$$

where the limit is taken in the sense of tempered distributions. Using integration by parts, it is possible to show that this limit is well defined, and that there exists a differential operator $L$ such that the resulting distribution $f(x)$ acting on any $\psi$ in the Schwartz space is given by

$$\langle f, \psi \rangle = \int e^{i \phi(x, \xi)} L\big(a(x, \xi) \, \psi(x)\big) \, \mathrm{d}x \, \mathrm{d}\xi,$$

where this integral converges absolutely. The operator $L$ is not uniquely defined, but can be chosen in such a way that depends only on the phase function $\phi$, the order $m$ of the symbol $a$, and $N$. In fact, given any integer $M$, it is possible to find an operator $L$ so that the integrand above is bounded by $C(1 + |\xi|)^{-M}$ for $|\xi|$ sufficiently large. This is the main purpose of the definition of the symbol classes.

== Examples ==
Many familiar distributions can be written as oscillatory integrals.

The Fourier inversion theorem implies that the delta function, $\delta(x)$ is equal to

$$\frac{1}{(2\pi)^n} \int_{\mathbb{R}^n} e^{i x \cdot \xi} \, \mathrm{d}\xi.$$

If we apply the first method of defining this oscillatory integral from above, as well as the Fourier transform of the Gaussian, we obtain a well known sequence of functions which approximate the delta function:

$$\delta(x) = \lim_{\varepsilon \to 0^+}\frac{1}{(2\pi)^n} \int_{\mathbb{R}^n} e^{i x \cdot \xi} e^{-\varepsilon |\xi|^2/2} \mathrm{d}\xi = \lim_{\varepsilon \to 0^+} \frac{1}{(\sqrt{2\pi \varepsilon})^n} e^{-|x|^2/(2 \varepsilon)}.$$

An operator $L$ in this case is given for example by

$$L = \frac{(1 - \Delta_x)^k}{(1 + |\xi|^2)^k},$$

where $\Delta_x$ is the Laplacian with respect to the $x$ variables, and $k$ is any integer greater than $(n - 1)/2$. Indeed, with this $L$ we have

$$\langle \delta, \psi \rangle = \psi(0) = \frac{1}{(2\pi)^n} \int_{\mathbb{R}^n} e^{i x \cdot \xi} L(\psi)(x, \xi)\, \mathrm{d}\xi \, \mathrm{d}x,$$

and this integral converges absolutely.

The Schwartz kernel of any differential operator can be written as an oscillatory integral. Indeed if

$$L = \sum \limits_{|\alpha| \leq m} p_\alpha(x) D^\alpha,$$

where $D^\alpha = \partial^\alpha_{x}/i^{|\alpha|}$, then the kernel of $L$ is given by

$$\frac{1}{(2\pi)^n} \int_{\mathbb{R}^n} e^{i \xi \cdot (x - y)} \sum \limits_{|\alpha| \leq m} p_\alpha(x) \, \xi^\alpha \, \mathrm{d}\xi.$$

== Relation to Lagrangian distributions ==
Any Lagrangian distribution can be represented locally by oscillatory integrals, see Hörmander (1983). Conversely, any oscillatory integral is a Lagrangian distribution. This gives a precise description of the types of distributions which may be represented as oscillatory integrals.

== See also ==
- Riemann–Lebesgue lemma
- van der Corput lemma
- Oscillatory integral operator
