= David B. Hertz =

American academic (1919-2011)

- Born: David Bendel Hertz; 1919
- Died: June 13, 2011 (aged 91–92)
- Education: Columbia University; Naval Postgraduate School; New York University
- Known for: Pioneering the use of Monte Carlo methods in finance
- Awards: George E. Kimball Medal (1981)
- Scientific career
- Fields: Operations research
- Workplaces: University of Miami; Columbia University

David Bendel Hertz (c. 1919 – June 13, 2011) was an operations research practitioner and academic, known for various contributions to the discipline, and specifically, and more widely, for pioneering the use of Monte Carlo methods in finance. He developed innovative modeling approaches for the solution of complex management issues. His earliest publications added insights to the industrial process of research and development.

He was a professor at the University of Miami, where he was distinguished professor of artificial intelligence, director of the University of Miami Intelligent Computer Systems Research Institute, and a professor of management science and law. He served as TIMS President (1964), ORSA President (1974), and was a recipient of the George E. Kimball Medal (1981). He was also a fellow of INFORMS (2002). Previously, he had been a practicing lawyer, and a partner at McKinsey and Company and at Arthur Andersen Company. He was also a professor at Columbia University. He served as a commander in the U.S. Navy during World War II. He was affectionately nicknamed "Cuz-Cuz" by his peers.

He is published and cited in various journals on technology, management and operations research, and has authored several textbooks. His most widely cited papers include Electronics in Management (Management Science, February 1965), Risk Analysis in Capital Investment (Harvard Business Review, January/February 1964) and Investment Policies That Pay Off (Harvard Business Review, January/February 1968).

He earned his BA (1939), BS (1940), and PhD (1949) at Columbia, as well as an MS from the U.S. Navy Postgraduate School (1944) and a JD from New York University Law School (1984). His PhD in Mathematics addressed "The Theory and Practice of Industrial Research".
