= Scattering rate =

Rate at which particles are scattered by a material

In physics, the scattering rate describes the rate at which a beam of particles is scattered while passing through a material. It represents the probability per unit time that a particle will be deflected from its original trajectory by an interaction, such as with impurities or phonons in a crystal lattice. The scattering rate, often denoted by $w$ or $\Gamma$, is a crucial concept in solid-state physics and condensed matter physics, as it determines various material properties, including electrical conductivity and thermal conductivity.

== The interaction picture ==
Define the unperturbed Hamiltonian by $H_0$, the time dependent perturbing Hamiltonian by $H_1$ and total Hamiltonian by $H$.

The eigenstates of the unperturbed Hamiltonian are assumed to be

$$H=H_0+H_1\$$
$$H_0 |k\rang = E(k)|k\rang$$

In the interaction picture, the state ket is defined by

$$|k(t)\rang _I= e^{iH_0 t /\hbar} |k(t)\rang_S= \sum_{k'} c_{k'}(t) |k'\rang$$

By a Schrödinger equation, we see

$$i\hbar \frac{\partial}{\partial t} |k(t)\rang_I=H_{1I}|k(t)\rang_I$$

which is a Schrödinger-like equation with the total $H$ replaced by $H_{1I}$.

Solving the differential equation, we can find the coefficient of n-state.

$$c_{k'}(t) =\delta_{k,k'} - \frac{i}{\hbar}  \int_0^t dt' \;\lang k'|H_1(t')|k\rang \, e^{-i(E_k - E_{k'})t'/\hbar}$$

where, the zeroth-order term and first-order term are

$$c_{k'}^{(0)}=\delta_{k,k'}$$
$$c_{k'}^{(1)}=- \frac{i}{\hbar}  \int_0^t dt' \;\lang k'|H_1(t')|k\rang \, e^{-i(E_k - E_{k'})t'/\hbar}$$

== The transition rate ==
The probability of finding $|k'\rang$ is found by evaluating $|c_{k'}(t)|^2$.

In case of constant perturbation,$c_{k'}^{(1)}$ is calculated by

$$c_{k'}^{(1)}=\frac{\lang\ k'|H_1|k\rang }{E_{k'}-E_k}(1-e^{i(E_{k'} - E_k)t/\hbar})$$

$$|c_{k'}(t)|^2= |\lang\ k'|H_1|k\rang |^2\frac {sin ^2(\frac {E_{k'}-E_k} {2 \hbar}t)}  { ( \frac {E_{k'}
-E_k} {2 \hbar} ) ^2 }\frac {1}{\hbar^2}$$

Using the equation which is

$$\lim_{\alpha \rightarrow \infty} \frac{1}{\pi} \frac{sin^2(\alpha x)}{\alpha x^2}= \delta(x)$$

The transition rate of an electron from the initial state $k$ to final state $k'$ is given by

$$P(k,k')=\frac {2 \pi} {\hbar} |\lang\ k'|H_1|k\rang |^2 \delta(E_{k'}-E_k)$$

where $E_k$ and $E_{k'}$ are the energies of the initial and final states including the perturbation state and ensures the $\delta$-function indicate energy conservation.

== The scattering rate ==
The scattering rate w(k) is determined by summing all the possible finite states k' of electron scattering from an initial state k to a final state k', and is defined by

$$w(k)=\sum_{k'}P(k,k')=\frac {2 \pi} {\hbar} \sum_{k'} |\lang\ k'|H_1|k\rang |^2 \delta(E_{k'}-E_k)$$

The integral form is

$$w(k)=\frac {2 \pi} {\hbar} \frac {L^3} {(2 \pi)^3} \int d^3k' |\lang\ k'|H_1|k\rang |^2 \delta(E_{k'}-E_k)$$
