= Monte Carlo methods in finance =

Probabilistic measurement methods

Monte Carlo methods are used in corporate finance and mathematical finance to value and analyze (complex) instruments, portfolios and investments by simulating the various sources of uncertainty affecting their value, and then determining the distribution of their value over the range of resultant outcomes. This is usually done by help of stochastic asset models. The advantage of Monte Carlo methods over other techniques increases as the dimensions (sources of uncertainty) of the problem increase.

Monte Carlo methods were first introduced to finance in 1964 by David B. Hertz through his Harvard Business Review article, discussing their application in Corporate Finance. In 1977, Phelim Boyle pioneered the use of simulation in derivative valuation in his seminal Journal of Financial Economics paper.

This article discusses typical financial problems in which Monte Carlo methods are used. It also touches on the use of so-called "quasi-random" methods such as the use of Sobol sequences.

== Overview ==
The Monte Carlo method encompasses any technique of statistical sampling employed to approximate solutions to quantitative problems. Essentially, the Monte Carlo method solves a problem by directly simulating the underlying (physical) process and then calculating the (average) result of the process. This very general approach is valid in areas such as physics, chemistry, computer science etc.

In finance, the Monte Carlo method is used to simulate the various sources of uncertainty that affect the value of the instrument, portfolio or investment in question, and to then calculate a representative value given these possible values of the underlying inputs. ("Covering all conceivable real world contingencies in proportion to their likelihood.") In terms of financial theory, this, essentially, is an application of risk neutral valuation; see also risk neutrality.

Applications:

- In Corporate Finance, project finance and real options analysis, Monte Carlo Methods are used by financial analysts who wish to construct "stochastic" or probabilistic financial models as opposed to the traditional static and deterministic models. Here, in order to analyze the characteristics of a project's net present value (NPV), the cash flow components that are (heavily) impacted by uncertainty are modeled, incorporating any correlation between these, mathematically reflecting their "random characteristics". Then, these results are combined in a histogram of NPV (i.e. the project's probability distribution), and the average NPV of the potential investment – as well as its volatility and other sensitivities – is observed. This distribution allows, for example, for an estimate of the probability that the project has a net present value greater than zero (or any other value). See further under Corporate finance.
- In valuing an option on equity, the simulation generates several thousand possible (but random) price paths for the underlying share, with the associated exercise value (i.e. "payoff") of the option for each path. These payoffs are then averaged and discounted to today, and this result is the value of the option today. Note that whereas equity options are more commonly valued using other pricing models such as lattice based models, for path dependent exotic derivatives – such as Asian options – simulation is the valuation method most commonly employed; see Monte Carlo methods for option pricing for discussion as to further – and more complex – option modelling.
- To value fixed income instruments and interest rate derivatives the underlying source of uncertainty which is simulated is the short rate – the annualized interest rate at which an entity can borrow money for a given period of time; see Short-rate model. For example, for bonds, and bond options, under each possible evolution of interest rates we observe a different yield curve and a different resultant bond price. To determine the bond value, these bond prices are then averaged; to value the bond option, as for equity options, the corresponding exercise values are averaged and present valued. A similar approach is used in valuing swaps, swaptions, and convertible bonds. As for equity, for path dependent interest rate derivatives – such as CMOs – simulation is the primary technique employed; (Note that "to create realistic interest rate simulations" Multi-factor short-rate models are sometimes employed.)
- Monte Carlo Methods are used for portfolio evaluation. Here, for each sample, the correlated behaviour of the factors impacting the component instruments is simulated over time, the resultant value of each instrument is calculated, and the portfolio value is then observed. As for corporate finance, above, the various portfolio values are then combined in a histogram, and the statistical characteristics of the portfolio are observed, and the portfolio assessed as required. Here analysts may apply Principal component analysis, where through dimensionality reduction, a limited set of factors may be simulated instead of each of the individual sources of uncertainty.
- A similar approach is used in calculating value at risk, or "VaR", an estimate of how much a position, "desk", or other area might lose with a given probability (or confidence level) and in a set time period. A typical application of VaR is in investment banking, where the bank holds economic “risk capital” corresponding to the estimated number; see Financial risk management § Banking. VaR is also used in portfolio risk management, where, as above, simulation allows the fund manager to estimate losses at a given horizon and confidence level, and to then hedge as / if appropriate.
- Post crisis, banks will make various “valuation adjustments” - collectively XVA - when assessing the value of derivative contracts that they have entered into. The purpose of these is twofold: primarily to hedge for possible losses due to the other parties' failures to pay amounts due on the derivative contracts (credit valuation adjustment); but also to determine (and hedge) the amount of capital required under the bank capital adequacy rules. These are calculated under a simulation framework as the risk-neutral expectation value of the possible loss or other impact. See Credit valuation adjustment § Calculation.
- Structurers use simulation to estimate the likely payout - and possibility of losses - of their bespoke structured note or other structured product, typically comprising several component securities.
- Monte Carlo Methods are used for personal financial planning. For instance, by simulating the overall market, the chances of a 401(k) allowing for retirement on a target income can be calculated. As appropriate, the worker in question can then take greater risks with the retirement portfolio or start saving more money.
- Discrete event simulation can be used in evaluating a proposed capital investment's impact on existing operations. Here, a "current state" model is constructed. Once operating correctly, having been tested and validated against historical data, the simulation is altered to reflect the proposed capital investment. This "future state" model is then used to assess the investment, by evaluating the improvement in performance (i.e. return) relative to the cost (via histogram as above); it may also be used in stress testing the design. See Discrete event simulation § Evaluating capital investment decisions.

Although Monte Carlo methods provide flexibility, and can handle multiple sources of uncertainty, the use of these techniques is nevertheless not always appropriate. In general, simulation methods are preferred to other valuation techniques only when there are several state variables (i.e. several sources of uncertainty). These techniques are also of limited use in valuing American style derivatives. See below.

== Applicability ==
=== Level of complexity ===
Many problems in mathematical finance entail the computation of a particular integral (for instance the problem of finding the arbitrage-free value of a particular derivative). In many cases these integrals can be valued analytically, and in still more cases they can be valued using numerical integration, or computed using a partial differential equation (PDE). However, when the number of dimensions (or degrees of freedom) in the problem is large, PDEs and numerical integrals become intractable, and in these cases Monte Carlo methods often give better results.

For more than three or four state variables, formulae such as Black–Scholes (i.e. analytic solutions) do not exist, while other numerical methods such as the Binomial options pricing model and finite difference methods face several difficulties and are not practical. In these cases, Monte Carlo methods converge to the solution more quickly than numerical methods, require less memory and are easier to program. For simpler situations, however, simulation is not the better solution because it is very time-consuming and computationally intensive.

Monte Carlo methods can deal with derivatives which have path dependent payoffs in a fairly straightforward manner. On the other hand, Finite Difference (PDE) solvers struggle with path dependence.

=== American options ===
Monte-Carlo methods are harder to use with American options. This is because, in contrast to a partial differential equation, the Monte Carlo method really only estimates the option value assuming a given starting point and time.

However, for early exercise, we would also need to know the option value at the intermediate times between the simulation start time and the option expiry time. In the Black–Scholes PDE approach these prices are easily obtained, because the simulation runs backwards from the expiry date. In Monte-Carlo this information is harder to obtain, but it can be done for example using the least squares algorithm of Carriere (see link to original paper) which was made popular a few years later by Longstaff and Schwartz (see link to original paper).

== Monte Carlo methods ==
=== Mathematically ===
The fundamental theorem of arbitrage-free pricing states that the value of a derivative is equal to the discounted expected value of the derivative payoff where the expectation is taken under the risk-neutral measure ^{[1]}. An expectation is, in the language of pure mathematics, simply an integral with respect to the measure. Monte Carlo methods are ideally suited to evaluating difficult integrals (see also Monte Carlo method).

Thus if we suppose that our risk-neutral probability space is $\mathbb{P}$ and that we have a derivative H that depends on a set of underlying instruments $S_1,...,S_n$. Then given a sample $\omega$ from the probability space the value of the derivative is $H( S_1(\omega),S_2(\omega),\dots, S_n(\omega)) =: H(\omega)$. Today's value of the derivative is found by taking the expectation over all possible samples and discounting at the risk-free rate. I.e. the derivative has value:

$$H_0 = {DF}_T \int_\omega H(\omega)\, d\mathbb{P}(\omega)$$

where ${DF}_T$ is the discount factor corresponding to the risk-free rate to the final maturity date T years into the future.

Now suppose the integral is hard to compute. We can approximate the integral by generating sample paths and then taking an average. Suppose we generate N samples then

$$H_0 \approx {DF}_T \frac{1}{N} \sum_{\omega\in \text{sample set}} H(\omega)$$

which is much easier to compute.

=== Sample paths for standard models ===
In finance, underlying random variables (such as an underlying stock price) are usually assumed to follow a path that is a function of a Brownian motion ^{2}. For example, in the standard Black–Scholes model, the stock price evolves as

$$dS = \mu S \,dt + \sigma S \,dW_t.$$

To sample a path following this distribution from time 0 to T, we chop the time interval into M units of length $\delta t$, and approximate the Brownian motion over the interval $dt$ by a single normal variable of mean 0 and variance $\delta t$. This leads to a sample path of

$$S( k\delta t) = S(0) \exp\left( \sum_{i=1}^{k} \left[\left(\mu - \frac{\sigma^2}{2}\right)\delta t + \sigma\varepsilon_i\sqrt{\delta t}\right] \right)$$

for each k between 1 and M. Here each $\varepsilon_i$ is a draw from a standard normal distribution.

Let us suppose that a derivative H pays the average value of S between 0 and T then a sample path $\omega$ corresponds to a set $\{\varepsilon_1,\dots,\varepsilon_M\}$ and

$$H(\omega) = \frac1{M} \sum_{k=1}^{M} S( k \delta t).$$

We obtain the Monte-Carlo value of this derivative by generating N lots of M normal variables, creating N sample paths and so N values of H, and then taking the average. Commonly the derivative will depend on two or more (possibly correlated) underlyings. The method here can be extended to generate sample paths of several variables, where the normal variables building up the sample paths are appropriately correlated.

It follows from the central limit theorem that quadrupling the number of sample paths approximately halves the error in the simulated price (i.e. the error has order $\epsilon=\mathcal{O}\left(N^{-1/2}\right)$ convergence in the sense of standard deviation of the solution).

In practice Monte Carlo methods are used for European-style derivatives involving at least three variables (more direct methods involving numerical integration can usually be used for those problems with only one or two underlyings. See Monte Carlo option model.

=== Greeks ===
Estimates for the "Greeks" of an option i.e. the (mathematical) derivatives of option value with respect to input parameters, can be obtained by numerical differentiation. This can be a time-consuming process (an entire Monte Carlo run must be performed for each "bump" or small change in input parameters). Further, taking numerical derivatives tends to emphasize the error (or noise) in the Monte Carlo value – making it necessary to simulate with a large number of sample paths. Practitioners regard these points as a key problem with using Monte Carlo methods.

=== Variance reduction ===
Square root convergence is slow, and so using the naive approach described above requires using a very large number of sample paths (1 million, say, for a typical problem) in order to obtain an accurate result. Remember that an estimator for the price of a derivative is a random variable, and in the framework of a risk-management activity, uncertainty on the price of a portfolio of derivatives and/or on its risks can lead to suboptimal risk-management decisions.

This state of affairs can be mitigated by variance reduction techniques.

==== Antithetic paths ====
A simple technique is, for every sample path obtained, to take its antithetic path — that is given a path $\{\varepsilon_1,\dots,\varepsilon_M\}$ to also take $\{-\varepsilon_1,\dots,-\varepsilon_M\}$. Since the variables $\varepsilon_i$ and $-\varepsilon_i$ form an antithetic pair, a large value of one is accompanied by a small value of the other. This suggests that an unusually large or small output computed from the first path may be balanced by the value computed from the antithetic path, resulting in a reduction in variance. Not only does this reduce the number of normal samples to be taken to generate N paths, but also, under same conditions, such as negative correlation between two estimates, reduces the variance of the sample paths, improving the accuracy.

==== Control variate method ====
It is also natural to use a control variate. Let us suppose that we wish to obtain the Monte Carlo value of a derivative H, but know the value analytically of a similar derivative I. Then H* = (Value of H according to Monte Carlo) + B*[(Value of I analytically) − (Value of I according to same Monte Carlo paths)] is a better estimate, where B is covar(H,I)/var(H).

The intuition behind that technique, when applied to derivatives, is the following: note that the source of the variance of a derivative will be directly dependent on the risks (e.g. delta, vega) of this derivative. This is because any error on, say, the estimator for the forward value of an underlier, will generate a corresponding error depending on the delta of the derivative with respect to this forward value. The simplest example to demonstrate this consists in comparing the error when pricing an at-the-money call and an at-the-money straddle (i.e. call+put), which has a much lower delta.

Therefore, a standard way of choosing the derivative I consists in choosing a replicating portfolios of options for H. In practice, one will price H without variance reduction, calculate deltas and vegas, and then use a combination of calls and puts that have the same deltas and vegas as control variate.

==== Importance sampling ====
Importance sampling consists of simulating the Monte Carlo paths using a different probability distribution (also known as a change of measure) that will give more likelihood for the simulated underlier to be located in the area where the derivative's payoff has the most convexity (for example, close to the strike in the case of a simple option). The simulated payoffs are then not simply averaged as in the case of a simple Monte Carlo, but are first multiplied by the likelihood ratio between the modified probability distribution and the original one (which is obtained by analytical formulas specific for the probability distribution). This will ensure that paths whose probability have been arbitrarily enhanced by the change of probability distribution are weighted with a low weight (this is how the variance gets reduced).

This technique can be particularly useful when calculating risks on a derivative. When calculating the delta using a Monte Carlo method, the most straightforward way is the black-box technique consisting in doing a Monte Carlo on the original market data and another one on the changed market data, and calculate the risk by doing the difference. Instead, the importance sampling method consists in doing a Monte Carlo in an arbitrary reference market data (ideally one in which the variance is as low as possible), and calculate the prices using the weight-changing technique described above. This results in a risk that will be much more stable than the one obtained through the black-box approach.

=== Quasi-random (low-discrepancy) methods ===
Instead of generating sample paths randomly, it is possible to systematically (and in fact completely deterministically, despite the "quasi-random" in the name) select points in a probability spaces so as to optimally "fill up" the space. The selection of points is a low-discrepancy sequence such as a Sobol sequence. Taking averages of derivative payoffs at points in a low-discrepancy sequence is often more efficient than taking averages of payoffs at random points.

== Notes ==
1. Frequently it is more practical to take expectations under different measures, however these are still fundamentally integrals, and so the same approach can be applied.
2. More general processes, such as Lévy processes, are also sometimes used. These may also be simulated.

== See also ==
- Quasi-Monte Carlo methods in finance
- Monte Carlo method
- Historical simulation (finance)
- Stock market simulator
- Real options valuation
