= Harald Niederreiter =

Austrian mathematician

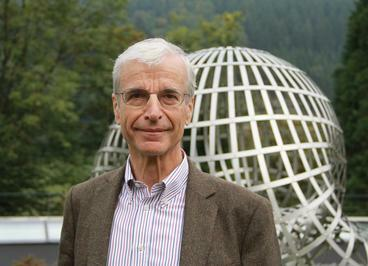
Harald Niederreiter in Oberwolfach, 2013

Harald G. Niederreiter (born June 7, 1944) is an Austrian mathematician known for his work in discrepancy theory, algebraic geometry, quasi-Monte Carlo methods, and cryptography.

== Education and career ==
Niederreiter was born on June 7, 1944, in Vienna, and grew up in Salzburg. He began studying mathematics at the University of Vienna in 1963, and finished his doctorate there in 1969, with a thesis on discrepancy in compact abelian groups supervised by Edmund Hlawka. He began his academic career as an assistant professor at the University of Vienna, but soon moved to Southern Illinois University. During this period he also visited the University of Illinois at Urbana-Champaign, Institute for Advanced Study, and University of California, Los Angeles. In 1978 he moved again, becoming the head of a new mathematics department at the University of the West Indies in Jamaica. In 1981 he returned to Austria for a post at the Austrian Academy of Sciences, where from 1989 to 2000 he served as director of the Institutes of Information Processing and Discrete Mathematics. In 2001 he became a professor at the National University of Singapore. In 2009 he returned to Austria again, to the Johann Radon Institute for Computational and Applied Mathematics of the Austrian Academy of Sciences. He also worked from 2010 to 2011 as a professor at the King Fahd University of Petroleum and Minerals in Saudi Arabia.

== Research ==
Niederreiter's initial research interests were in the abstract algebra of abelian groups and finite fields, subjects also represented by his later book Finite Fields (with Rudolf Lidl, 1983). From his doctoral thesis onwards, he also incorporated discrepancy theory and the theory of uniformly distributed sets in metric spaces into his study of these subjects.

In 1970, Niederreiter began to work on numerical analysis and random number generation, and in 1974 he published the book Uniform Distribution of Sequences. Combining his work on pseudorandom numbers with the Monte Carlo method, he did pioneering research in the quasi-Monte Carlo method in the late 1970s, and again later published a book on the topic, Random Number Generation and Quasi-Monte Carlo Methods (1995).

Niederreiter's interests in pseudorandom numbers also led him to study stream ciphers in the 1980s, and this interest branched out into other areas of cryptography such as public key cryptography. The Niederreiter cryptosystem, an encryption system based on error-correcting codes that can also be used for digital signatures, was developed by him in 1986. His work in cryptography is represented by his book Algebraic Geometry in Coding Theory and Cryptography (with C. P. Xing, 2009).

Returning to pure mathematics, Niederreiter has also made contributions to algebraic geometry with the discovery of many dense curves over finite fields, and published the book Rational Points on Curves over Finite Fields: Theory and Applications (with C. P. Xing, 2001).

== Awards and honors ==
Niederreiter is a member of the Austrian Academy of Sciences and the German Academy of Sciences Leopoldina. In 1998 he was an invited speaker at the International Congress of Mathematicians, and won the Kardinal Innitzer Prize. He became a fellow of the American Mathematical Society in 2013.

Niederreiter's book Random Number Generation and Quasi-Monte Carlo Methods won the Outstanding Simulation Publication Award.

In 2014, a workshop in honor of Niederreiter's 70th birthday was held at the Johann Radon Institute for Computational and Applied Mathematics of the Austrian Academy of Sciences, and a Festschrift was published in his honor.
