= Causes of the Great Recession =

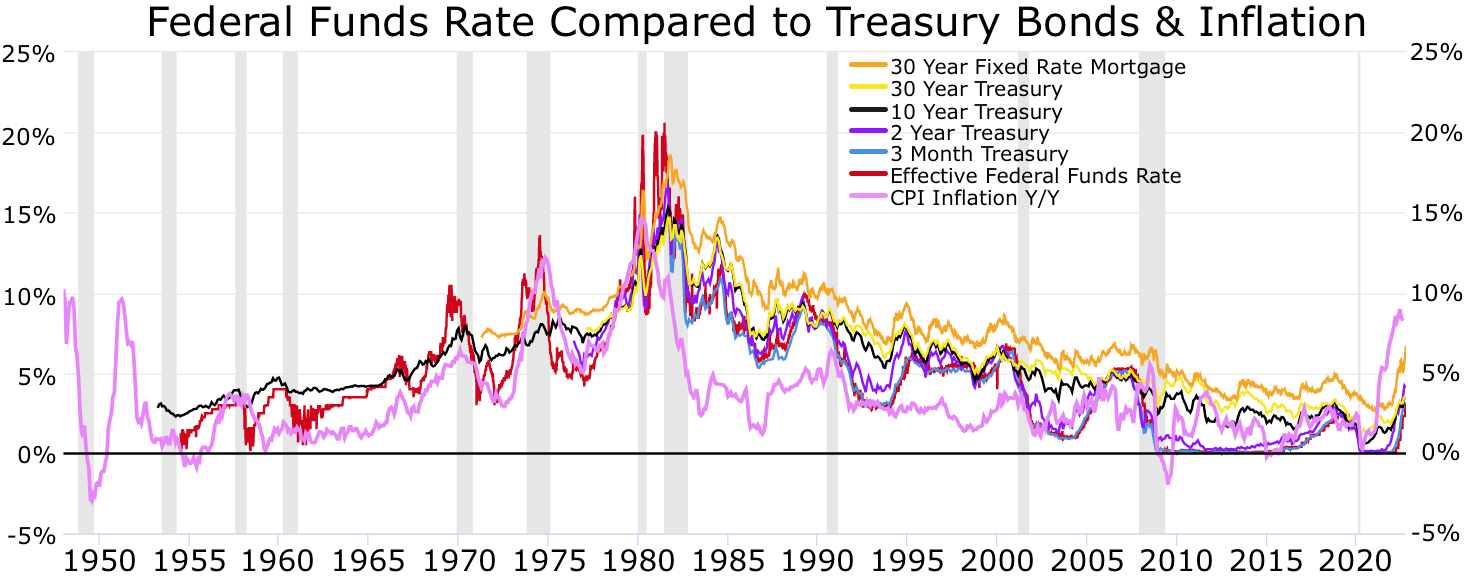
The Federal Reserve raised the Federal funds rate causing an Inverted yield curve, to slow inflation and get housing prices and commodity prices down, that usually puts the economy into a recession. 30-year mortgage average 30 Year Treasury Bond 10 Year Treasury Bond 2 Year Treasury Bond 3-month Treasury Bond Effective Federal Funds Rate CPI inflation year/year Recessions

Many factors directly and indirectly serve as the causes of the Great Recession that started in 2008 with the US subprime mortgage crisis. The major causes of the initial subprime mortgage crisis and the following recession include lax lending standards contributing to the real-estate bubbles that have since burst; U.S. government housing policies; and limited regulation of non-depository financial institutions. Once the recession began, various responses were attempted with different degrees of success. These included fiscal policies of governments; monetary policies of central banks; measures designed to help indebted consumers refinance their mortgage debt; and inconsistent approaches used by nations to bail out troubled banking industries and private bondholders, assuming private debt burdens or socializing losses.

== Overview ==
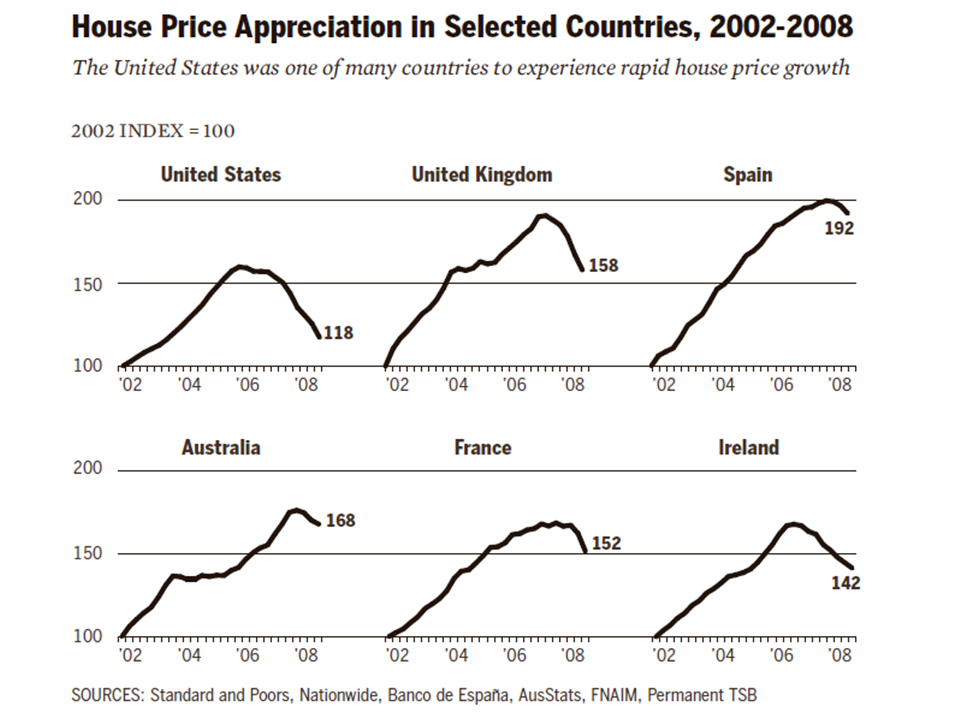
Housing price appreciation in selected countries, 2002–2008

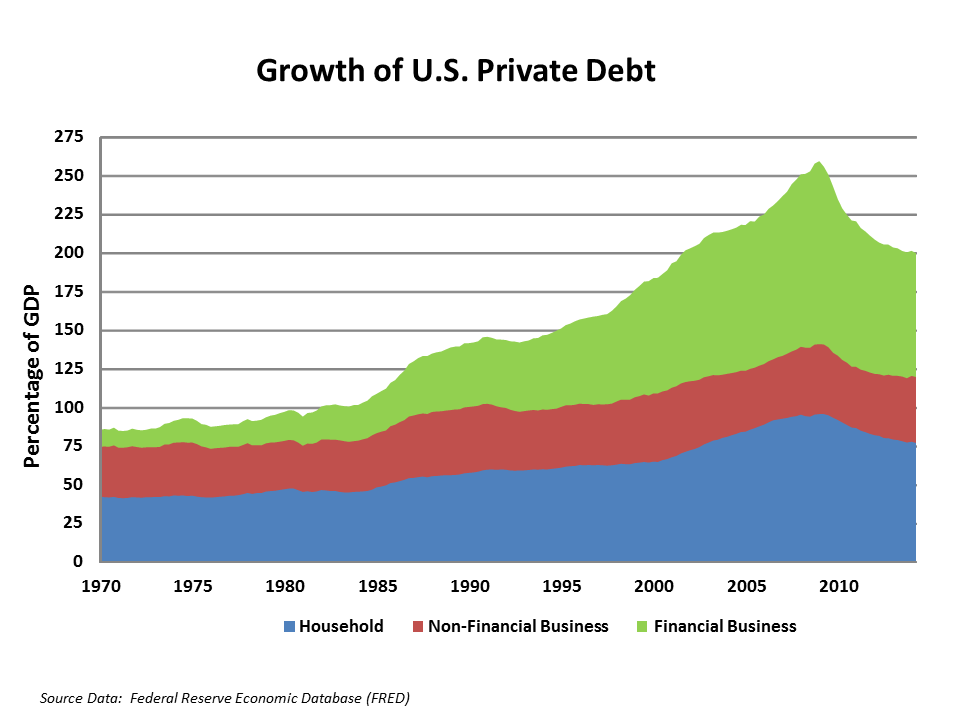
U.S. households and financial businesses significantly increased borrowing (leverage) in the years leading up to the crisis

The immediate or proximate cause of the crisis in 2008 was the failure or risk of failure at major financial institutions globally, starting with the rescue of investment bank Bear Stearns in March 2008 and the failure of Lehman Brothers in September 2008. Many of these institutions had invested in risky securities that lost much or all of their value when U.S. and European housing bubbles began to deflate during the 2007–2009 period, depending on the country. Further, many institutions had become dependent on short-term (overnight) funding markets subject to disruption.

Many institutions lowered credit standards to continue feeding the global demand for mortgage securities, generating huge profits that their investors shared. They also shared the risk. When the bubbles developed, household debt levels rose sharply after the year 2000 globally. Households became dependent on being able to refinance their mortgages. Further, U.S. households often had adjustable rate mortgages, which had lower initial interest rates and payments that later rose. When global credit markets essentially stopped funding mortgage-related investments in the 2007–2008 period, U.S. homeowners were no longer able to refinance and defaulted in record numbers, leading to the collapse of securities backed by these mortgages that now pervaded the system.

The fall in asset prices (such as subprime mortgage-backed securities) during 2007 and 2008 caused the equivalent of a bank run on the U.S., which includes investment banks and other non-depository financial entities. This system had grown to rival the depository system in scale yet was not subject to the same regulatory safeguards. Struggling banks in the U.S. and Europe cut back lending causing a credit crunch. Consumers and some governments were no longer able to borrow and spend at pre-crisis levels. Businesses also cut back their investments as demand faltered and reduced their workforces. Higher unemployment due to the recession made it more difficult for consumers and countries to honor their obligations. This caused financial institution losses to surge, deepening the credit crunch, thereby creating an adverse feedback loop.

Federal Reserve Chair Ben Bernanke testified in September 2010 regarding the causes of the crisis. He wrote that there were shocks or triggers (i.e., particular events that touched off the crisis) and vulnerabilities (i.e., structural weaknesses in the financial system, regulation and supervision) that amplified the shocks. Examples of triggers included: losses on subprime mortgage securities that began in 2007 and a run on the shadow banking system that began in mid-2007, which adversely affected the functioning of money markets. Examples of vulnerabilities in the private sector included: financial institution dependence on unstable sources of short-term funding such as repurchase agreements or Repos; deficiencies in corporate risk management; excessive use of leverage (borrowing to invest); and inappropriate usage of derivatives as a tool for taking excessive risks. Examples of vulnerabilities in the public sector included: statutory gaps and conflicts between regulators; ineffective use of regulatory authority; and ineffective crisis management capabilities. Bernanke also discussed "Too big to fail" institutions, monetary policy, and trade deficits.

Economists surveyed by the University of Chicago rated the factors that caused the crisis in order of importance. The results included: 1) Flawed financial sector regulation and supervision; 2) Underestimating risks in financial engineering (e.g., CDOs); 3) Mortgage fraud and bad incentives; 4) Short-term funding decisions and corresponding runs in those markets (e.g., repo); and 5) Credit rating agency failures.

== Narratives ==
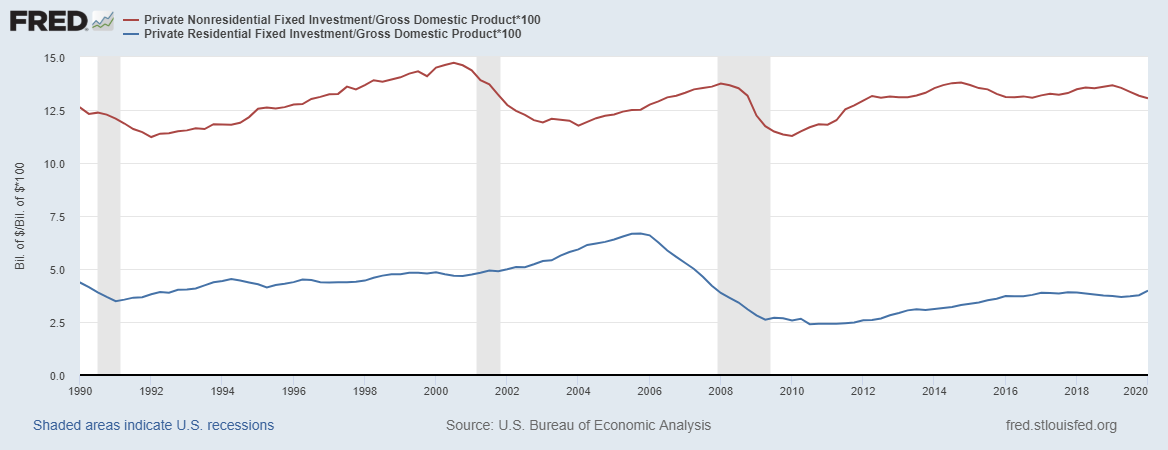
U.S. residential and non-residential investment fell relative to GDP during the crisis

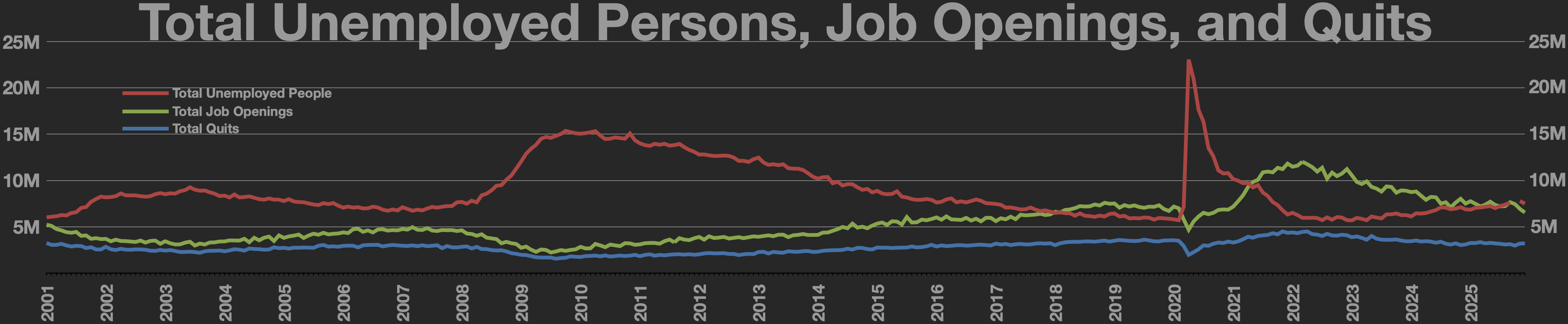
The inverted yield curve in 2008 caused an elevated level of unemployment relative to job openings to get the housing bubble prices down. Total unemployed people Total job openings Total quits

There are several "narratives" attempting to place the causes of the crisis into context, with overlapping elements. Five such narratives include:

1. There was the equivalent of a bank run on the shadow banking system, which includes investment banks and other non-depository financial entities. This system had grown to rival the depository system in scale yet was not subject to the same regulatory safeguards.
2. The economy was being driven by a housing bubble. When it burst, private residential investment (i.e., housing construction) fell by nearly 4%. GDP and consumption enabled by bubble-generated housing wealth also slowed. This created a gap in annual demand (GDP) of nearly $1 trillion. Government was unwilling to make up for this private sector shortfall.
3. Record levels of household debt accumulated in the decades preceding the crisis resulted in a "balance sheet recession" once housing prices began falling in 2006. Consumers began paying down debt, which reduces their consumption, slowing down the economy for an extended period while debt levels are reduced.
4. Government policies that encouraged home ownership even for those who could not afford it, contributing to lax lending standards, unsustainable housing price increases, and indebtedness.
5. The financial turmoil induced an increase in money demand (precautionary hoarding). This increase in money demand triggered a corresponding decline in commodity demand.

One narrative describing the causes of the crisis begins with the significant increase in savings available for investment during the 2000–2007 period when the global pool of fixed-income securities increased from approximately $36 trillion in 2000 to $80 trillion by 2007. This "Giant Pool of Money" increased as savings from high-growth developing nations entered global capital markets. Investors searching for higher yields than those offered by U.S. Treasury bonds sought alternatives globally.

The temptation offered by such readily available savings overwhelmed the policy and regulatory control mechanisms in country after country, as lenders and borrowers put these savings to use, generating bubble after bubble across the globe.

When these bubbles burst, causing asset prices (e.g., housing and commercial property) to decline, the liabilities owed to global investors remained at full price, generating questions regarding the solvency of consumers, governments, and banking systems. The effect of this debt overhang is to slow consumption and therefore economic growth and is referred to as a "balance sheet recession" or debt-deflation.

== Housing market ==
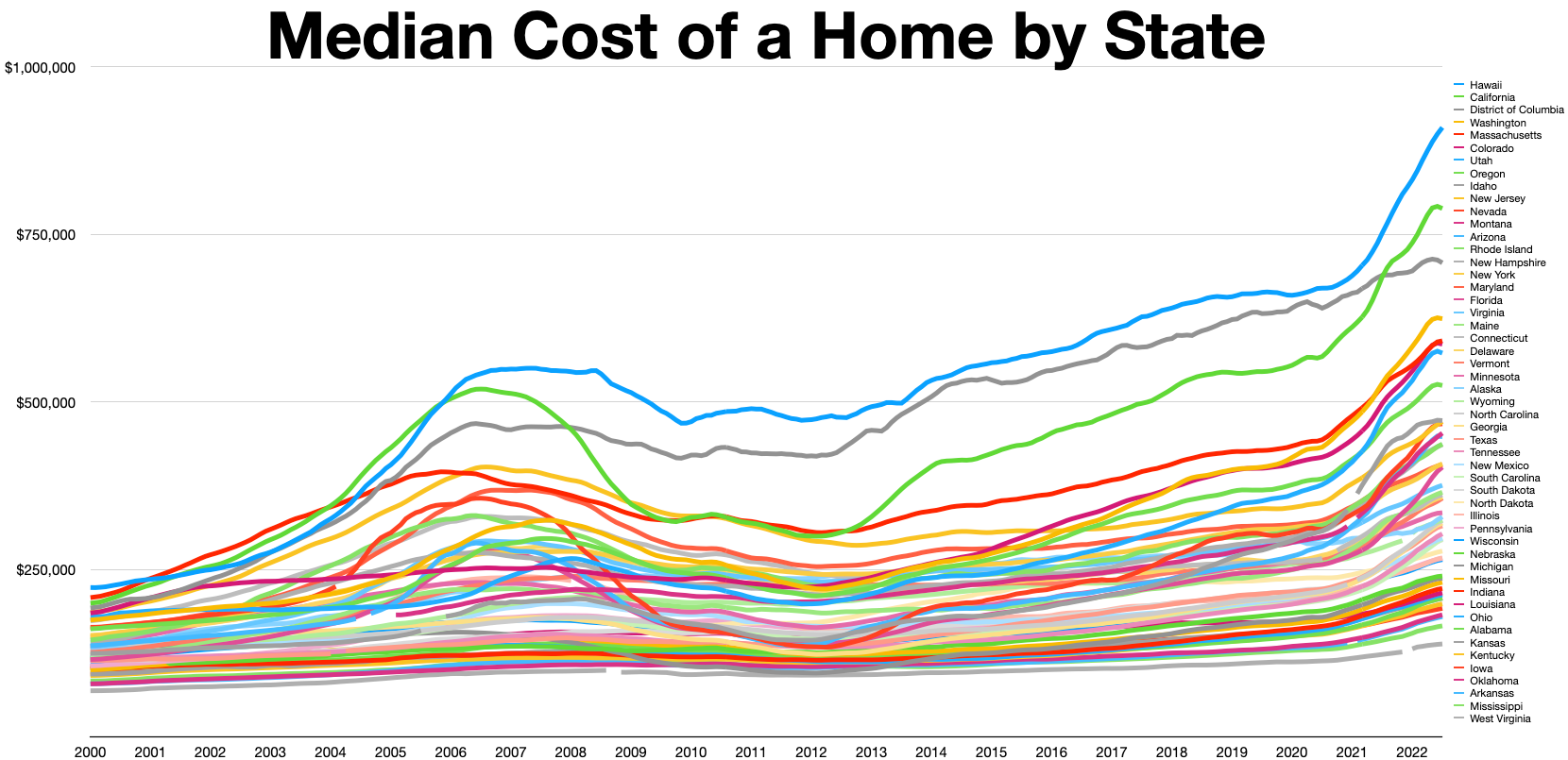
Cost of housing by State

=== The U.S. housing bubble and foreclosures ===
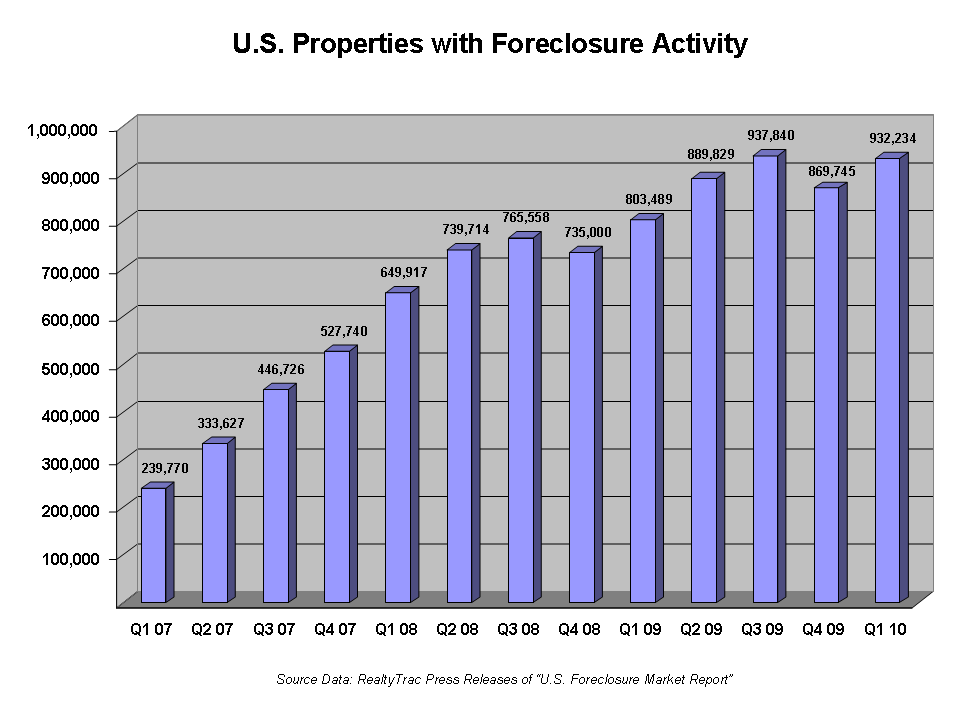
Number of U.S. residential properties subject to foreclosure actions by quarter (2007–2009).

Between 1997 and 2006, the price of the typical American house increased by 124%. During the two decades ending in 2001, the national median home price ranged from 2.9 to 3.1 times median household income. This ratio rose to 4.0 in 2004, and 4.6 in 2006. This housing bubble resulted in quite a few homeowners refinancing their homes at lower interest rates, or financing consumer spending by taking out second mortgages secured by the price appreciation.

By September 2008, average U.S. housing prices had declined by over 20% from their mid-2006 peak. Easy credit, and a belief that house prices would continue to appreciate, had encouraged many subprime borrowers to obtain adjustable-rate mortgages. These mortgages enticed borrowers with a below market interest rate for some predetermined period, followed by market interest rates for the remainder of the mortgage's term. Borrowers who could not make the higher payments once the initial grace period ended would try to refinance their mortgages. Refinancing became more difficult, once house prices began to decline in many parts of the US. Borrowers who found themselves unable to escape higher monthly payments by refinancing began to default. During 2007, lenders had begun foreclosure proceedings on nearly 1.3 million properties, a 79% increase over 2006. This increased to 2.3 million in 2008, an 81% increase vs. 2007. As of August 2008, 9.2% of all mortgages outstanding were either delinquent or in foreclosure.

The Economist described the issue this way: "No part of the financial crisis has received so much attention, with so little to show for it, as the tidal wave of home foreclosures sweeping over America. Government programmes have been ineffectual, and private efforts not much better." Up to 9 million homes were at risk of entering foreclosure over the 2009–2011 period, versus one million in a typical year. At roughly U.S. $50,000 per foreclosure according to a 2006 study by the Chicago Federal Reserve Bank, 9 million foreclosures represents $450 billion in losses.

=== Subprime lending ===
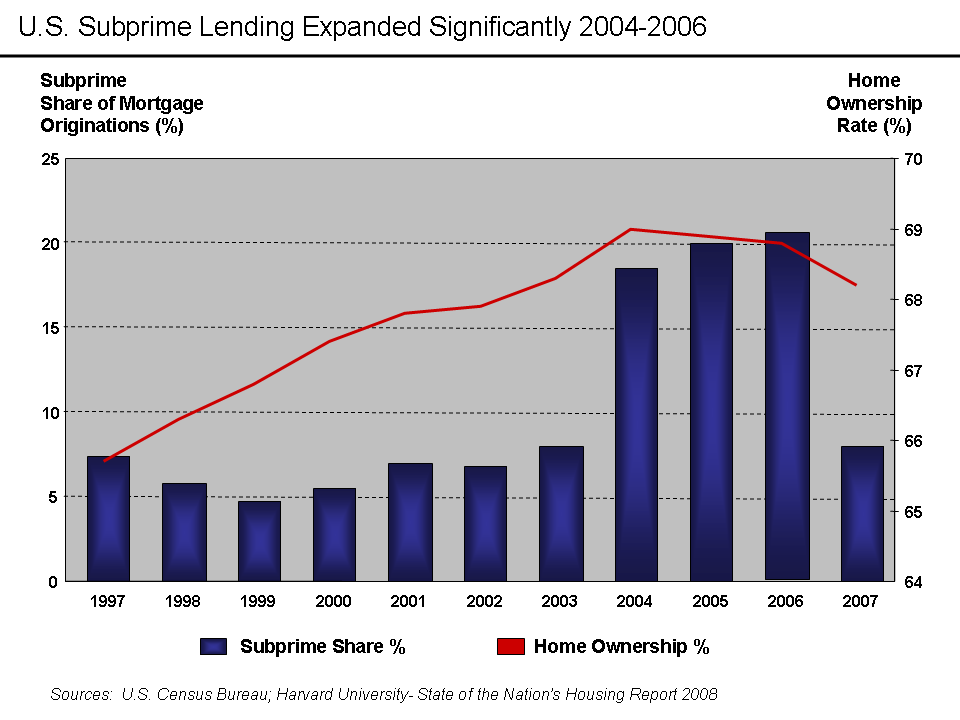
U.S. Subprime lending expanded dramatically 2004–2006

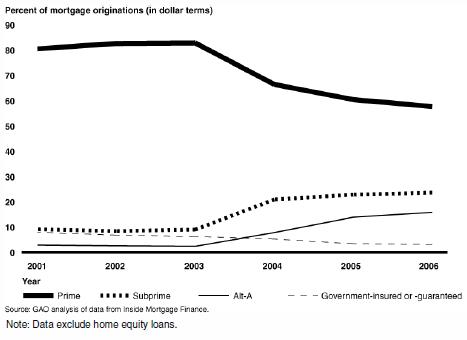
GAO Historical Data

In addition to easy credit conditions, there is evidence that both competitive pressures and some government regulations contributed to an increase in the amount of subprime lending during the years preceding the crisis. Major U.S. investment banks and, to a lesser extent, government-sponsored enterprises like Fannie Mae played an important role in the expansion of higher-risk lending.

The term subprime refers to the credit quality of particular borrowers, who have weakened credit histories at a greater risk of loan default than prime borrowers. The value of U.S. subprime mortgages was estimated at $1.3 trillion as of March 2007, with over 7.5 million first-lien subprime mortgages outstanding.

Subprime mortgages remained below 10% of all mortgage originations until 2004, when they spiked to nearly 20% and remained there through the 2005–2006 peak of the United States housing bubble. A proximate event to this increase was the April 2004 decision by the U.S. Securities and Exchange Commission (SEC) to relax the net capital rule, which encouraged the largest five investment banks to dramatically increase their financial leverage and aggressively expand their issuance of mortgage-backed securities. Subprime mortgage payment delinquency rates remained in the 10–15% range from 1998 to 2006, then began to increase rapidly, rising to 25% by early 2008.

==== Mortgage underwriting ====
In addition to considering higher-risk borrowers, lenders offered increasingly risky loan options and borrowing incentives. Mortgage underwriting standards declined gradually during the boom period, particularly from 2004 to 2007. The use of automated loan approvals let loans be made without appropriate review and documentation. In 2007, 40% of all subprime loans resulted from automated underwriting. The chairman of the Mortgage Bankers Association claimed that mortgage brokers, while profiting from the home loan boom, did not do enough to examine whether borrowers could repay. Mortgage fraud by lenders and borrowers increased enormously. Adverse selection in low-to-no documentation loans can account for a substantial fraction of losses on home foreclosures between 2007 and 2012.

A study by analysts at the Federal Reserve Bank of Cleveland found that the average difference between subprime and prime mortgage interest rates (the "subprime markup") declined significantly between 2001 and 2007. The quality of loans originated also worsened gradually during that period. The combination of declining risk premia and credit standards is common to boom and bust credit cycles. The authors also concluded that the decline in underwriting standards did not directly trigger the crisis, because the gradual changes in standards did not statistically account for the large difference in default rates for subprime mortgages issued between 2001 and 2005 (which had a 10% default rate within one year of origination) and 2006–2007 (which had a 20% rate). In other words, standards gradually declined but defaults suddenly jumped. Furthermore, the authors argued that the trend in worsening loan quality was harder to detect with rising housing prices, as more refinancing options were available, keeping the default rate lower.

==== Mortgage fraud ====
In 2004, the Federal Bureau of Investigation warned of an "epidemic" in mortgage fraud, an important credit risk of non-prime mortgage lending, which, they said, could lead to "a problem that could have as much impact as the S&L crisis".

==== Down payments and negative equity ====
A down payment refers to the cash paid to the lender for the home and represents the initial homeowners' equity or financial interest in the home. A low down payment means that a home represents a highly leveraged investment for the homeowner, with little equity relative to debt. In such circumstances, only small declines in the value of the home result in negative equity, a situation in which the value of the home is less than the mortgage amount owed. In 2005, the median down payment for first-time home buyers was 2%, with 43% of those buyers making no down payment whatsoever. By comparison, China has down payment requirements that exceed 20%, with higher amounts for non-primary residences.

A 2009 paper identifies twelve economists and commentators who, between 2000 and 2006, predicted a recession based on the collapse of the then-booming housing market in the United States: Dean Baker, Wynne Godley, Fred Harrison, Michael Hudson, Eric Janszen, Med Jones Steve Keen, Jakob Brøchner Madsen, Jens Kjaer Sørensen, Kurt Richebächer, Nouriel Roubini, Peter Schiff, and Robert Shiller. Roubini wrote in Forbes in July 2009 that: "Home prices have already fallen from their peak by about 30%. Based on my analysis, they are going to fall by at least 40% from their peak, and more likely 45%, before they bottom out. They are still falling at an annualized rate of over 18%. That fall of at least 40%–45% percent of home prices from their peak is going to imply that about half of all households that have a mortgage—about 25 million of the 51 million that have mortgages—are going to be underwater with negative equity and will have a significant incentive to walk away from their homes."

Economist Stan Leibowitz argued in The Wall Street Journal that the extent of equity in the home was the key factor in foreclosure, rather than the type of loan, credit worthiness of the borrower, or ability to pay. Although only 12% of homes had negative equity (meaning the property was worth less than the mortgage obligation), they comprised 47% of foreclosures during the second half of 2008. Homeowners with negative equity have less financial incentive to stay in the home.

The L.A. Times reported the results of a study that found homeowners with high credit scores at the time of entering a mortgage are 50% more likely to "strategically default"—abruptly and intentionally pull the plug and abandon the mortgage—compared with lower-scoring borrowers. Such strategic defaults were heavily concentrated in markets with the highest price declines. An estimated 588,000 strategic defaults occurred nationwide during 2008, more than double the total in 2007. They represented 18% of all serious delinquencies that extended for more than 60 days in the fourth quarter of 2008.

==== Predatory lending ====
Predatory lending refers to the practice of unscrupulous lenders, to enter into "unsafe" or "unsound" secured loans for inappropriate purposes. A classic bait-and-switch method was used by Countrywide, advertising low interest rates for home refinancing. Such loans were written into mind-numbingly detailed contracts and then swapped for more expensive loan products on the day of closing. Whereas the advertisement might have stated that 1% or 1.5% interest would be charged, the consumer would be put into an adjustable rate mortgage (ARM) in which the interest charged would be greater than the amount of interest paid. This created negative amortization, which the credit consumer might not notice until long after the loan transaction had been consummated.

Countrywide, sued by California attorney general Jerry Brown for "Unfair Business Practices" and "False Advertising" was making high cost mortgages "to homeowners with weak credit, adjustable rate mortgages (ARMs) that allowed homeowners to make interest-only payments.". When housing prices decreased, homeowners in ARMs then had little incentive to pay their monthly payments, since their home equity had disappeared. This caused Countrywide's financial condition to deteriorate, ultimately resulting in a decision by the Office of Thrift Supervision to seize the lender.

Countrywide, according to Republican Lawmakers, had involved itself in making low-cost loans to politicians, for purposes of gaining political favors.

Former employees from Ameriquest, which was United States's leading wholesale lender, described a system in which they were pushed to falsify mortgage documents and then sell the mortgages to Wall Street banks eager to make fast profits. There is growing evidence that such mortgage frauds may be a large cause of the crisis.

Others have pointed to the passage of the Gramm–Leach–Bliley Act by the 106th Congress, and over-leveraging by banks and investors eager to achieve high returns on capital.

== Risk-taking behavior ==
In a June 2009 speech, U.S. president Barack Obama argued that a "culture of irresponsibility" was an important cause of the crisis. He criticized executive compensation that "rewarded recklessness rather than responsibility" and Americans who bought homes "without accepting the responsibilities." He continued that there "was far too much debt and not nearly enough capital in the system. And a growing economy bred complacency." Excessive consumer housing debt was in turn caused by the mortgage-backed security, credit default swap, and collateralized debt obligation sub-sectors of the finance industry, which were offering irrationally low interest rates and irrationally high levels of approval to subprime mortgage consumers. Formulas for calculating aggregate risk were based on the gaussian copula which wrongly assumed that individual components of mortgages were independent. In fact the credit-worthiness of almost every new subprime mortgage was highly correlated with that of any other, due to linkages through consumer spending levels which fell sharply when property values began to fall during the initial wave of mortgage defaults. Debt consumers were acting in their rational self-interest, because they were unable to audit the finance industry's opaque faulty risk pricing methodology.

A key theme of the crisis is that many large financial institutions did not have a sufficient financial cushion to absorb the losses they sustained or to support the commitments made to others. Using technical terms, these firms were highly leveraged (i.e., they maintained a high ratio of debt to equity) or had insufficient capital to post as collateral for their borrowing. A key to a stable financial system is that firms have the financial capacity to support their commitments. Michael Lewis and David Einhorn argued: "The most critical role for regulation is to make sure that the sellers of risk have the capital to support their bets."

=== Consumer and household borrowing ===
U.S. households and financial institutions became increasingly indebted or overleveraged during the years preceding the crisis. This increased their vulnerability to the collapse of the housing bubble and worsened the ensuing economic downturn.

- USA household debt as a percentage of annual disposable personal income was 127% at the end of 2007, versus 77% in 1990.
- U.S. home mortgage debt relative to gross domestic product (GDP) increased from an average of 46% during the 1990s to 73% during 2008, reaching $10.5 trillion.
- In 1981, U.S. private debt was 123% of GDP; by the third quarter of 2008, it was 290%.

Several economists and think tanks have argued that income inequality is one of the reasons for this over-leveraging. Research by Raghuram Rajan indicated that: "Starting in the early 1970s, advanced economies found it increasingly difficult to grow...the shortsighted political response to the anxieties of those falling behind was to ease their access to credit. Faced with little regulatory restraint, banks overdosed on risky loans."

== Excessive private debt levels ==
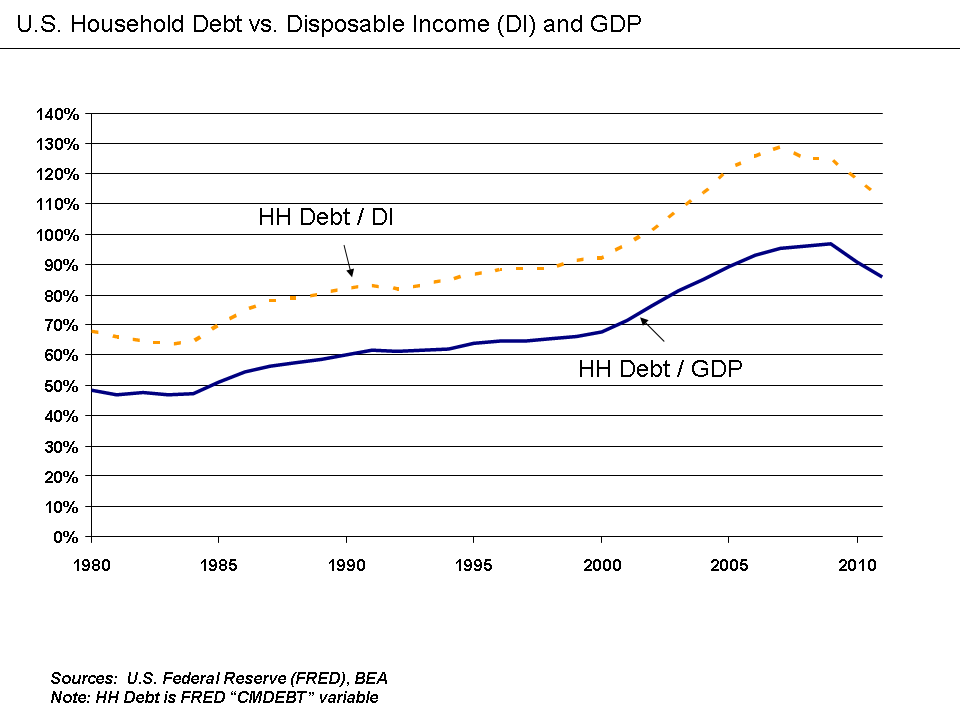
U.S. household debt relative to disposable income and GDP.

To counter the 2000 Stock Market Crash and subsequent economic slowdown, the Federal Reserve eased credit availability and drove interest rates down to lows not seen in many decades. These low interest rates facilitated the growth of debt at all levels of the economy, chief among them private debt to purchase more expensive housing. High levels of debt have long been recognized as a causative factor for recessions. Any debt default has the possibility of causing the lender to also default, if the lender is itself in a weak financial condition and has too much debt. This second default in turn can lead to still further defaults through a domino effect. The chances of these follow-up defaults is increased at high levels of debt. Attempts to prevent this domino effect by bailing out Wall Street lenders such as AIG, Fannie Mae, and Freddie Mac have had mixed success. The takeover is another example of attempts to stop the dominoes from falling.There was a real irony in the recent intervention by the Federal Reserve System to provide the money that enabled the firm of JPMorgan Chase to buy Bear Stearns before it went bankrupt. The point was to try to prevent a domino effect of panic in the financial markets that could lead to a downturn in the economy.

Excessive consumer housing debt was in turn caused by the mortgage-backed security, credit default swap, and collateralized debt obligation sub-sectors of the finance industry, which were offering irrationally low interest rates and irrationally high levels of approval to subprime mortgage consumers because they were calculating aggregate risk using gaussian copula formulas that strictly assumed the independence of individual component mortgages, when in fact the credit-worthiness almost every new subprime mortgage was highly correlated with that of any other because of linkages through consumer spending levels which fell sharply when property values began to fall during the initial wave of mortgage defaults. Debt consumers were acting in their rational self-interest, because they were unable to audit the finance industry's opaque faulty risk pricing methodology.

According to M.S. Eccles, who was appointed chairman of the Federal Reserve by FDR and held that position until 1948, excessive debt levels were not a source cause of the Great Depression. Increasing debt levels were caused by a concentration of wealth during the 1920s, causing the middle and poorer classes, which saw a relative and/or actual decrease in wealth, to go increasingly into debt in an attempt to maintain or improve their living standards. According to Eccles this concentration of wealth was the source cause of the Great Depression. The ever-increasing debt levels eventually became unpayable, and therefore unsustainable, leading to debt defaults and the financial panics of the 1930s. The concentration of wealth in the modern era parallels that of the 1920s and has had similar effects. Some of the causes of wealth concentration in the modern era are lower tax rates for the rich, such as Warren Buffett paying taxes at a lower rate than the people working for him, policies such as propping up the stock market, which benefit the stock owning rich more than the middle or poorer classes who own little or no stock, and bailouts which funnel tax money collected largely from the middle class to bail out large corporations largely owned by the rich.

The International Monetary Fund (IMF) reported in April 2012: "Household debt soared in the years leading up to the Great Recession. In advanced economies, during the five years preceding 2007, the ratio of household debt to income rose by an average of 39 percentage points, to 138 percent. In Denmark, Iceland, Ireland, the Netherlands, and Norway, debt peaked at more than 200 percent of household income. A surge in household debt to historic highs also occurred in emerging economies such as Estonia, Hungary, Latvia, and Lithuania. The concurrent boom in both house prices and the stock market meant that household debt relative to assets held broadly stable, which masked households’ growing exposure to a sharp fall in asset prices. When house prices declined, leading to the subprime mortgage crisis, many households saw their wealth shrink relative to their debt, and, with less income and more unemployment, found it harder to meet mortgage payments. By the end of 2011, real house prices had fallen from their peak by about 41% in Ireland, 29% in Iceland, 23% in Spain and the United States, and 21% in Denmark. Household defaults, underwater mortgages (where the loan balance exceeds the house value), foreclosures, and fire sales are now endemic to a number of economies. Household deleveraging by paying off debts or defaulting on them has begun in some countries. It has been most pronounced in the United States, where about two-thirds of the debt reduction reflects defaults."

=== Home equity extraction ===
This refers to homeowners borrowing and spending against the value of their homes, typically via a home equity loan or when selling the home. Free cash used by consumers from home equity extraction doubled from $627 billion in 2001 to $1,428 billion in 2005 as the housing bubble built, a total of nearly $5 trillion over the period, contributing to economic growth worldwide. U.S. home mortgage debt relative to GDP increased from an average of 46% during the 1990s to 73% during 2008, reaching $10.5 trillion.

Economist Tyler Cowen explained that the economy was highly dependent on this home equity extraction: "In the 1993–1997 period, home owners extracted an amount of equity from their homes equivalent to 2.3% to 3.8% GDP. By 2005, this figure had increased to 11.5% GDP."

=== Housing speculation ===
Speculative borrowing in residential real estate has been cited as a contributing factor to the subprime mortgage crisis. During 2006, 22% of homes purchased (1.65 million units) were for investment purposes, with an additional 14% (1.07 million units) purchased as vacation homes. During 2005, these figures were 28% and 12%, respectively. In other words, a record level of nearly 40% of homes purchases were not intended as primary residences. David Lereah, NAR's chief economist at the time, stated that the 2006 decline in investment buying was expected: "Speculators left the market in 2006, which caused investment sales to fall much faster than the primary market."

Housing prices nearly doubled between 2000 and 2006, a vastly different trend from the historical appreciation at roughly the rate of inflation. While homes had not traditionally been treated as investments subject to speculation, this behavior changed during the housing boom. Media widely reported condominiums being purchased while under construction, then being "flipped" (sold) for a profit without the seller ever having lived in them. Some mortgage companies identified risks inherent in this activity as early as 2005, after identifying investors assuming highly leveraged positions in multiple properties.

One 2017 NBER study argued that real estate investors (i.e., those owning 2+ homes) were more to blame for the crisis than subprime borrowers: "The rise in mortgage defaults during the crisis was concentrated in the middle of the credit score distribution, and mostly attributable to real estate investors" and that "credit growth between 2001 and 2007 was concentrated in the prime segment, and debt to high-risk [subprime] borrowers was virtually constant for all debt categories during this period." The authors argued that this investor-driven narrative was more accurate than blaming the crisis on lower-income, subprime borrowers. A 2011 Fed study had a similar finding: "In states that experienced the largest housing booms and busts, at the peak of the market almost half of purchase mortgage originations were associated with investors. In part by apparently misreporting their intentions to occupy the property, investors took on more leverage, contributing to higher rates of default." The Fed study reported that mortgage originations to investors rose from 25% in 2000 to 45% in 2006, for Arizona, California, Florida, and Nevada overall, where housing price increases during the bubble (and declines in the bust) were most pronounced. In these states, investor delinquency rose from around 15% in 2000 to over 35% in 2007 and 2008.

Nicole Gelinas of the Manhattan Institute described the negative consequences of not adjusting tax and mortgage policies to the shifting treatment of a home from conservative inflation hedge to speculative investment. Economist Robert Shiller argued that speculative bubbles are fueled by "contagious optimism, seemingly impervious to facts, that often takes hold when prices are rising. Bubbles are primarily social phenomena; until we understand and address the psychology that fuels them, they're going to keep forming."

Mortgage risks were underestimated by every institution in the chain from originator to investor by underweighting the possibility of falling housing prices given historical trends of rising prices. Misplaced confidence in innovation and excessive optimism led to miscalculations by both public and private institutions.

=== Pro-cyclical human nature ===
Keynesian economist Hyman Minsky described how speculative borrowing contributed to rising debt and an eventual collapse of asset values. Economist Paul McCulley described how Minsky's hypothesis translates to the current crisis, using Minsky's words: "...from time to time, capitalist economies exhibit inflations and debt deflations which seem to have the potential to spin out of control. In such processes, the economic system's reactions to a movement of the economy amplify the movement—inflation feeds upon inflation and debt-deflation feeds upon debt deflation." In other words, people are momentum investors by nature, not value investors. People naturally take actions that expand the apex and nadir of cycles. One implication for policymakers and regulators is the implementation of counter-cyclical policies, such as contingent capital requirements for banks that increase during boom periods and are reduced during busts.

=== Corporate risk-taking and leverage ===
Leverage ratios of investment banks increased significantly between 2003 and 2007.

The former CEO of Citigroup Charles O. Prince said in November 2007: "As long as the music is playing, you've got to get up and dance." This metaphor summarized how financial institutions took advantage of easy credit conditions, by borrowing and investing large sums of money, a practice called leveraged lending. Debt taken on by financial institutions increased from 63.8% of U.S. gross domestic product in 1997 to 113.8% in 2007.

==== Net capital rule ====
A decision by the United States Securities and Exchange Commission in 2004 related to the net capital rule allowed U.S. investment banks to issue substantially more debt, which was then used to help fund the housing bubble through purchases of mortgage-backed securities. The change in regulation left the capital adequacy requirement at the same level but added a risk weighting that lowered capital requirements on AAA rated bonds and tranches. This led to a shift from first loss tranches to highly rated less risky tranches and was seen as an improvement in risk management in the spirit of Basel II.

From 2004 to 2007, the top five U.S. investment banks each significantly increased their financial leverage (see diagram), which increased their vulnerability to a financial shock. These five institutions reported over $4.1 trillion in debt for fiscal year 2007, about 30% of USA nominal GDP for 2007. Lehman Brothers was liquidated, Bear Stearns and Merrill Lynch were sold at fire-sale prices, and Goldman Sachs and Morgan Stanley became commercial banks, subjecting themselves to more stringent regulation. With the exception of Lehman, these companies required or received government support.

Fannie Mae and Freddie Mac, two U.S. government-sponsored enterprises, owned or guaranteed nearly $5 trillion in mortgage obligations at the time they were placed into conservatorship by the U.S. government in September 2008.

These seven entities were highly leveraged and had $9 trillion in debt or guarantee obligations, an enormous concentration of risk, yet were not subject to the same regulation as depository banks.

In a May 2008 speech, Ben Bernanke quoted Walter Bagehot: "A good banker will have accumulated in ordinary times the reserve he is to make use of in extraordinary times." However, this advice was not heeded by these institutions, which had used the boom times to increase their leverage ratio instead.

== Financial market factors ==
In its "Declaration of the Summit on Financial Markets and the World Economy," dated 15 November 2008, leaders of the Group of 20 cited the following causes related to features of the modern financial markets:

During a period of strong global growth, growing capital flows, and prolonged stability earlier this decade, market participants sought higher yields without an adequate appreciation of the risks and failed to exercise proper due diligence. At the same time, weak underwriting standards, unsound risk management practices, increasingly complex and opaque financial products, and consequent excessive leverage combined to create vulnerabilities in the system. Policy-makers, regulators and supervisors, in some advanced countries, did not adequately appreciate and address the risks building up in financial markets, keep pace with financial innovation, or take into account the systemic ramifications of domestic regulatory actions.

=== Financial product innovation ===
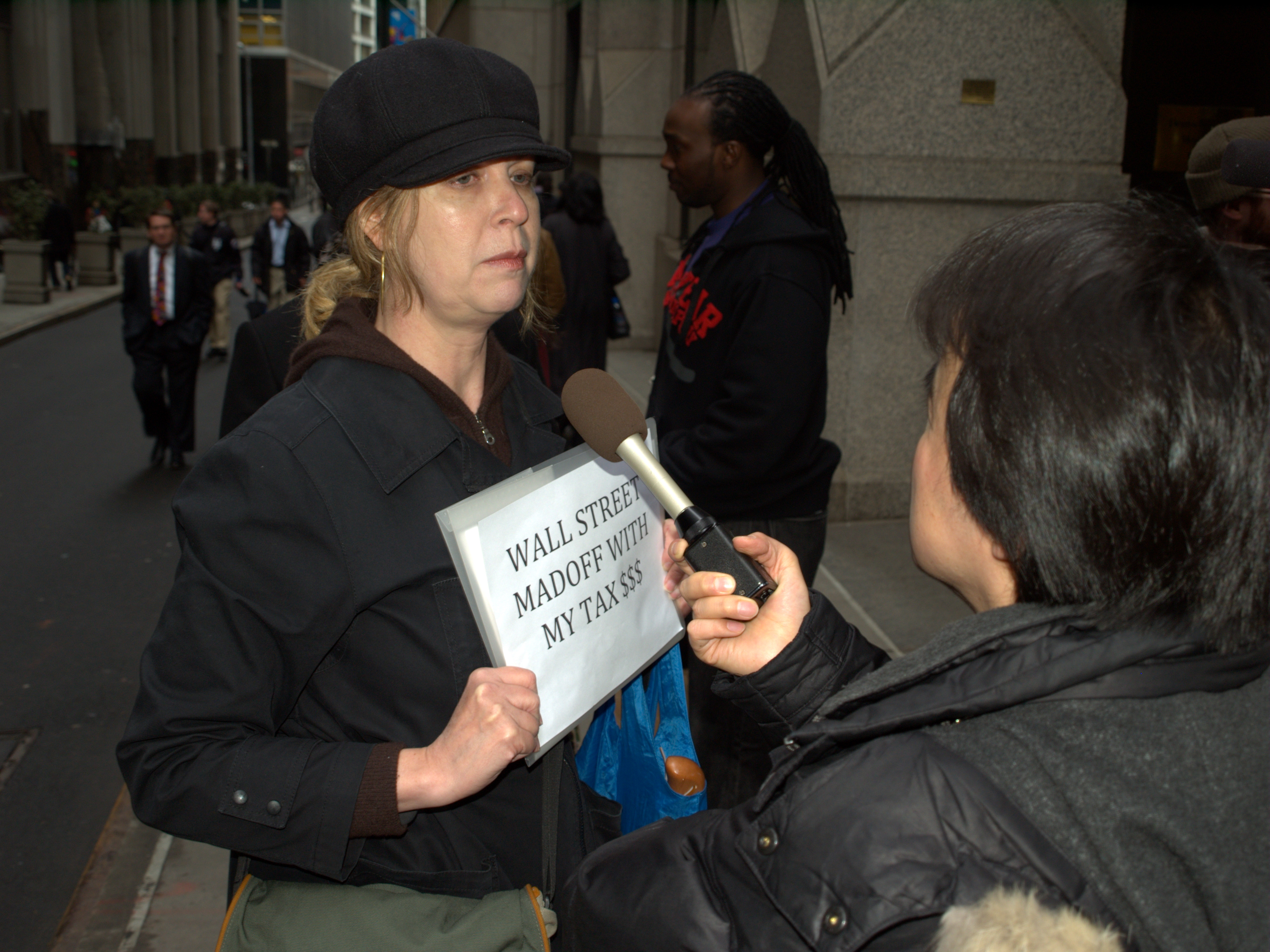
A protester on Wall Street in the wake of the AIG bonus payments controversy is interviewed by news media.

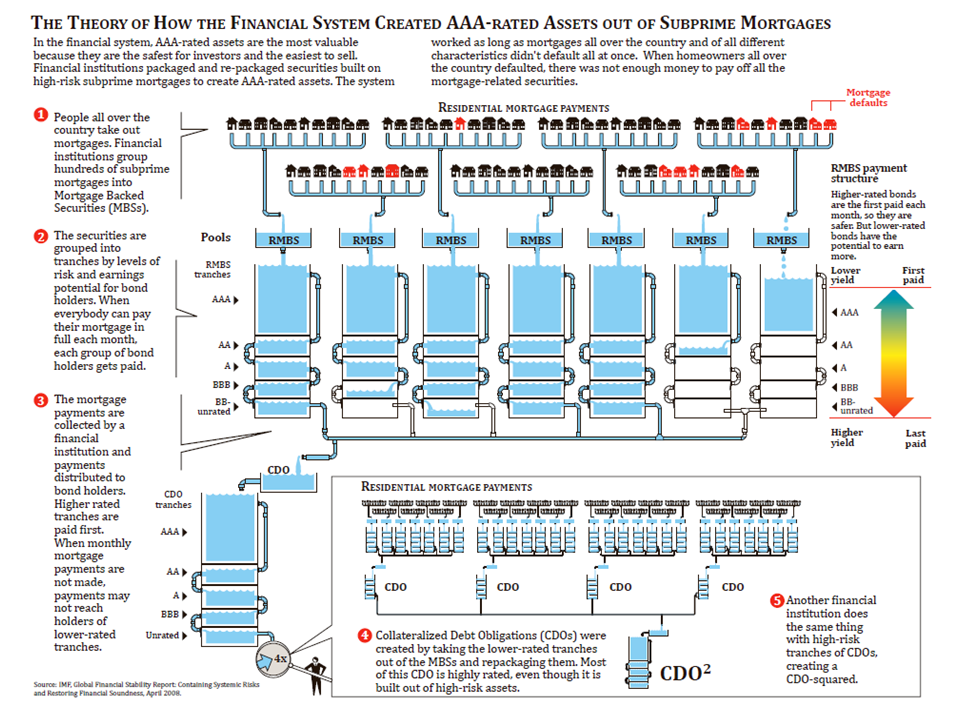
IMF Diagram of CDO and RMBS

The term financial innovation refers to the ongoing development of financial products designed to achieve particular client objectives, such as offsetting a particular risk exposure (such as the default of a borrower) or to assist with obtaining financing. Examples pertinent to this crisis included: the adjustable-rate mortgage; the bundling of subprime mortgages into mortgage-backed securities (MBS) or collateralized debt obligations (CDO) for sale to investors, a type of securitization; and a form of credit insurance called credit default swaps(CDS). The usage of these products expanded dramatically in the years leading up to the crisis. These products vary in complexity and the ease with which they can be valued on the books of financial institutions.

The CDO in particular enabled financial institutions to obtain investor funds to finance subprime and other lending, extending or increasing the housing bubble and generating large fees. Approximately $1.6 trillion in CDO's were originated between 2003 and 2007. A CDO essentially places cash payments from multiple mortgages or other debt obligations into a single pool, from which the cash is allocated to specific securities in a priority sequence. Those securities obtaining cash first received investment-grade ratings from rating agencies. Lower priority securities received cash thereafter, with lower credit ratings but theoretically a higher rate of return on the amount invested. A sample of 735 CDO deals originated between 1999 and 2007 showed that subprime and other less-than-prime mortgages represented an increasing percentage of CDO assets, rising from 5% in 2000 to 36% in 2007.

For a variety of reasons, market participants did not accurately measure the risk inherent with this innovation or understand its impact on the overall stability of the financial system. For example, the pricing model for CDOs clearly did not reflect the level of risk they introduced into the system. The average recovery rate for "high quality" CDOs has been approximately 32 cents on the dollar, while the recovery rate for mezzanine CDO's has been approximately five cents for every dollar. These massive, practically unthinkable, losses have dramatically impacted the balance sheets of banks across the globe, leaving them with very little capital to continue operations.

Others have pointed out that there were not enough of these loans made to cause a crisis of this magnitude. In an article in Portfolio Magazine, Michael Lewis spoke with one trader who noted that "There weren’t enough Americans with [bad] credit taking out [bad loans] to satisfy investors’ appetite for the end product." Essentially, investment banks and hedge funds used financial innovation to synthesize more loans using derivatives. "They were creating [loans] out of whole cloth. One hundred times over! That’s why the losses are so much greater than the loans."

Princeton professor Harold James wrote that one of the byproducts of this innovation was that MBS and other financial assets were "repackaged so thoroughly and resold so often that it became impossible to clearly connect the thing being traded to its underlying value." He called this a "...profound flaw at the core of the U.S. financial system..."

Another example relates to AIG, which insured obligations of various financial institutions through the usage of credit default swaps. The basic CDS transaction involved AIG receiving a premium in exchange for a promise to pay money to party A in the event party B defaulted. However, AIG did not have the financial strength to support its many CDS commitments as the crisis progressed and was taken over by the government in September 2008. U.S. taxpayers provided over $180 billion in government support to AIG during 2008 and early 2009, through which the money flowed to various counterparties to CDS transactions, including many large global financial institutions.

Author Michael Lewis wrote that CDS enabled speculators to stack bets on the same mortgage bonds and CDO's. This is analogous to allowing many persons to buy insurance on the same house. Speculators that bought CDS insurance were betting that significant defaults would occur, while the sellers (such as AIG) bet they would not.

In April 2010, market participants, including a hedge fund called Magnetar Capital, encouraged the creation of CDO's containing low quality mortgages, so they could bet against them using CDS. Magnetar encouraged investors to purchase CDO's while simultaneously betting against them, without disclosing the latter bet.

=== Inaccurate credit ratings ===
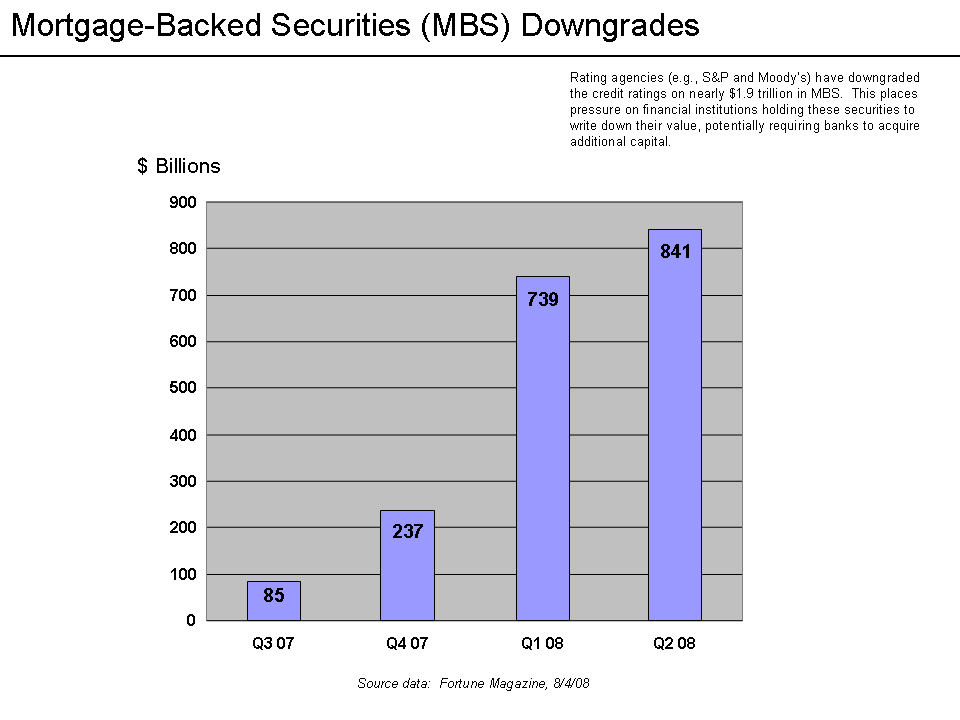
MBS credit rating downgrades, by quarter.

Credit rating agencies are under scrutiny for having given investment-grade ratings to MBSs based on risky subprime mortgage loans. These high ratings enabled these MBS to be sold to investors, thereby financing the housing boom. These ratings were believed justified because of risk reducing practices, such as credit default insurance and equity investors willing to bear the first losses. However, there are also indications that some involved in rating subprime-related securities knew at the time that the rating process was faulty.

An estimated $3.2 trillion in loans were made to homeowners with bad credit and undocumented incomes (e.g., subprime or Alt-A mortgages) between 2002 and 2007. Economist Joseph Stiglitz stated: "I view the rating agencies as one of the key culprits...They were the party that performed the alchemy that converted the securities from F-rated to A-rated. The banks could not have done what they did without the complicity of the rating agencies." Without the AAA ratings, demand for these securities would have been considerably less. Bank writedowns and losses on these investments totaled $523 billion as of September 2008.

The ratings of these securities was a lucrative business for the rating agencies, accounting for just under half of Moody's total ratings revenue in 2007. Through 2007, ratings companies enjoyed record revenue, profits and share prices. The rating companies earned as much as three times more for grading these complex products than corporate bonds, their traditional business. Rating agencies also competed with each other to rate particular MBS and CDO securities issued by investment banks, which critics argued contributed to lower rating standards. Interviews with rating agency senior managers indicate the competitive pressure to rate the CDO's favorably was strong within the firms. This rating business was their "golden goose" (which laid the proverbial golden egg or wealth) in the words of one manager. Author Upton Sinclair (1878–1968) famously stated: "It is difficult to get a man to understand something when his job depends on not understanding it." From 2000 to 2006, structured finance (which includes CDO's) accounted for 40% of the revenues of the credit rating agencies. During that time, one major rating agency had its stock increase six-fold and its earnings grew by 900%.

Critics allege that the rating agencies suffered from conflicts of interest, as they were paid by investment banks and other firms that organize and sell structured securities to investors. On 11 June 2008, the SEC proposed rules designed to mitigate perceived conflicts of interest between rating agencies and issuers of structured securities. On 3 December 2008, the SEC approved measures to strengthen oversight of credit rating agencies, following a ten-month investigation that found "significant weaknesses in ratings practices," including conflicts of interest.

Between Q3 2007 and Q2 2008, rating agencies lowered the credit ratings on $1.9 trillion in mortgage-backed securities. Financial institutions felt they had to lower the value of their MBS and acquire additional capital so as to maintain capital ratios. If this involved the sale of new shares of stock, the value of the existing shares was reduced. Thus ratings downgrades lowered the stock prices of many financial firms.

=== Lack of transparency in the system and independence in financial modeling ===
The limitations of many, widely used financial models also were not properly understood. Li's Gaussian copula formula assumed that the price of CDS was correlated with and could predict the correct price of mortgage backed securities. Because it was highly tractable, it rapidly came to be used by a huge percentage of CDO and CDS investors, issuers, and rating agencies. According to one wired.com article: "Then the model fell apart. Cracks started appearing early on, when financial markets began behaving in ways that users of Li's formula hadn't expected. The cracks became full-fledged canyons in 2008—when ruptures in the financial system's foundation swallowed up trillions of dollars and put the survival of the global banking system in serious peril... Li's Gaussian copula formula will go down in history as instrumental in causing the unfathomable losses that brought the world financial system to its knees."

George Soros commented that "The super-boom got out of hand when the new products became so complicated that the authorities could no longer calculate the risks and started relying on the risk management methods of the banks themselves. Similarly, the rating agencies relied on the information provided by the originators of synthetic products. It was a shocking abdication of responsibility."

=== Off-balance-sheet financing ===
Complex financing structures called structured investment vehicles (SIV) or conduits enabled banks to move significant amounts of assets and liabilities, including unsold CDO's, off their books. This had the effect of helping the banks maintain regulatory minimum capital ratios. They were then able to lend anew, earning additional fees. Author Robin Blackburn explained how they worked:

Institutional investors could be persuaded to buy the SIV's supposedly high-quality, short-term commercial paper, allowing the vehicles to acquire longer-term, lower quality assets, and generating a profit on the spread between the two. The latter included larger amounts of mortgages, credit-card debt, student loans and other receivables...For about five years those dealing in SIV's and conduits did very well by exploiting the spread...but this disappeared in August 2007, and the banks were left holding a very distressed baby.

Off balance sheet financing also made firms look less leveraged and enabled them to borrow at cheaper rates.

Banks had established automatic lines of credit to these SIV and conduits. When the cash flow into the SIV's began to decline as subprime defaults mounted, banks were contractually obligated to provide cash to these structures and their investors. This "conduit-related balance sheet pressure" placed strain on the banks' ability to lend, both raising interbank lending rates and reducing the availability of funds.

In the years leading up to the crisis, the top four U.S. depository banks moved an estimated $5.2 trillion in assets and liabilities off-balance sheet into these SIV's and conduits. This enabled them to essentially bypass existing regulations regarding minimum capital ratios, thereby increasing leverage and profits during the boom but increasing losses during the crisis. Accounting guidance was changed in 2009 that will require them to put some of these assets back onto their books, which significantly reduces their capital ratios. One news agency estimated this amount at between $500 billion and $1 trillion. This effect was considered as part of the stress tests performed by the government during 2009.

During March 2010, the bankruptcy court examiner released a report on Lehman Brothers, which had failed spectacularly in September 2008. The report indicated that up to $50 billion was moved off-balance sheet in a questionable manner by management during 2008, with the effect of making its debt level (leverage ratio) appear smaller. Analysis by the Federal Reserve Bank of New York indicated big banks mask their risk levels just prior to reporting data quarterly to the public.

=== Regulatory avoidance ===
Certain financial innovation may also have the effect of circumventing regulations, such as off-balance sheet financing that affects the leverage or capital cushion reported by major banks. For example, Martin Wolf wrote in June 2009: "...an enormous part of what banks did in the early part of this decade – the off-balance-sheet vehicles, the derivatives and the 'shadow banking system' itself – was to find a way round regulation."

=== Financial sector concentration ===
Niall Ferguson wrote that the financial sector became increasingly concentrated in the years leading up to the crisis, which made the stability of the financial system more reliant on just a few firms, which were also highly leveraged:

Between 1990 and 2008, according to Wall Street veteran Henry Kaufman, the share of financial assets held by the 10 largest U.S. financial institutions rose from 10 percent to 50 percent, even as the number of banks fell from more than 15,000 to about 8,000. By the end of 2007, 15 institutions with combined shareholder equity of $857 billion had total assets of $13.6 trillion and off-balance-sheet commitments of $5.8 trillion—a total leverage ratio of 23 to 1. They also had underwritten derivatives with a gross notional value of $216 trillion. These firms had once been Wall Street's "bulge bracket," the companies that led underwriting syndicates. Now they did more than bulge. These institutions had become so big that the failure of just one of them would pose a systemic risk.

By contrast, some scholars have argued that fragmentation in the mortgage securitization market led to increased risk taking and a deterioration in underwriting standards.

== Governmental policies ==
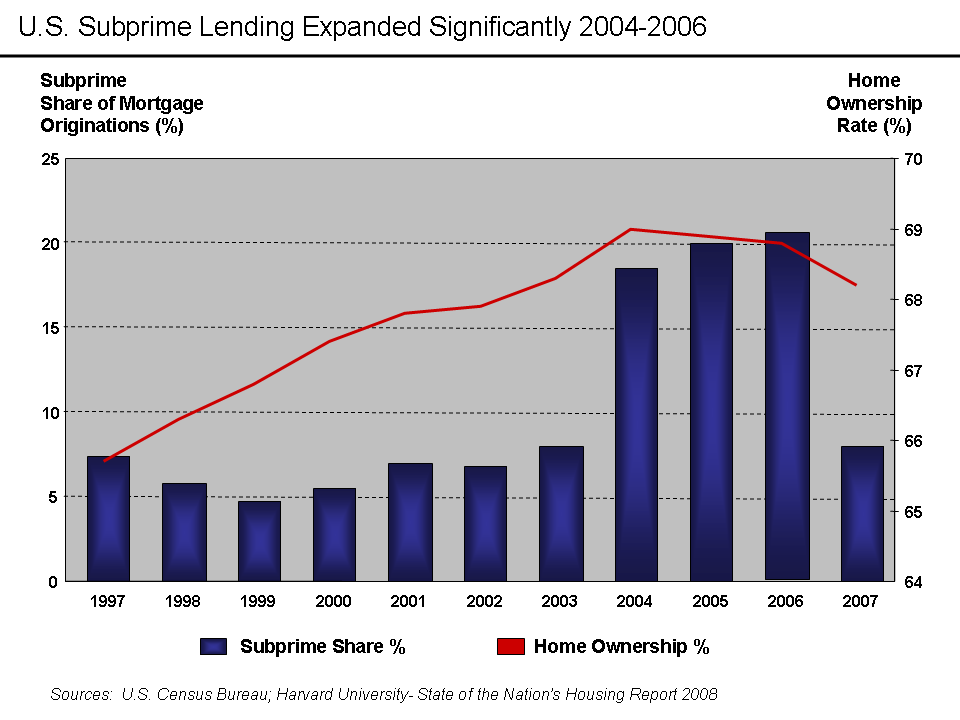
U.S. Subprime lending expanded dramatically 2004–2006.

=== Failure to regulate non-depository banking ===
The Shadow banking system grew to exceed the size of the depository system, but was not subject to the same requirements and protections. Nobel laureate Paul Krugman described the run on the shadow banking system as the "core of what happened" to cause the crisis. "As the shadow banking system expanded to rival or even surpass conventional banking in importance, politicians and government officials should have realized that they were re-creating the kind of financial vulnerability that made the Great Depression possible – and they should have responded by extending regulations and the financial safety net to cover these new institutions. Influential figures should have proclaimed a simple rule: anything that does what a bank does, anything that has to be rescued in crises the way banks are, should be regulated like a bank." He referred to this lack of controls as "malign neglect."

=== Affordable housing policies ===
Critics of government policy argued that government lending programs were the main cause of the crisis. The Financial Crisis Inquiry Commission (report of the Democratic party majority) stated that Fannie Mae and Freddie Mac, government affordable housing policies, and the Community Reinvestment Act were not primary causes of the crisis. The Republican members of the commission disagreed.

=== Government deregulation as a cause ===
In 1992, the Democratic-controlled 102nd Congress under the George H. W. Bush administration weakened regulation of Fannie Mae and Freddie Mac with the goal of making available more money for the issuance of home loans. The Washington Post wrote: "Congress also wanted to free up money for Fannie Mae and Freddie Mac to buy mortgage loans and specified that the pair would be required to keep a much smaller share of their funds on hand than other financial institutions. Whereas banks that held $100 could spend $90 buying mortgage loans, Fannie Mae and Freddie Mac could spend $97.50 buying loans. Finally, Congress ordered that the companies be required to keep more capital as a cushion against losses if they invested in riskier securities. But the rule was never set during the Clinton administration, which came to office that winter, and was only put in place nine years later."

Some economists have pointed to deregulation efforts as contributing to the collapse. In 1999, the Republican-controlled 106th Congress U.S. Congress under the Clinton administration passed the Gramm-Leach-Bliley Act, which repealed part of the Glass–Steagall Act of 1933. This repeal has been criticized by some for having contributed to the proliferation of the complex and opaque financial instruments at the heart of the crisis. However, some economists object to singling out the repeal of Glass–Steagall for criticism. Brad DeLong, a former advisor to President Clinton and economist at the University of California, Berkeley and Tyler Cowen of George Mason University have both argued that the Gramm-Leach-Bliley Act softened the impact of the crisis by allowing for mergers and acquisitions of collapsing banks as the crisis unfolded in late 2008.

== Capital market pressures ==
=== Private capital and the search for yield ===
In a Peabody Award winning program, NPR correspondents argued that a "Giant Pool of Money" (represented by $70 trillion in worldwide fixed income investments) sought higher yields than those offered by U.S. Treasury bonds early in the decade, which were low due to low interest rates and trade deficits discussed above. Further, this pool of money had roughly doubled in size from 2000 to 2007, yet the supply of relatively safe, income generating investments had not grown as fast. Investment banks on Wall Street answered this demand with the mortgage-backed security (MBS) and collateralized debt obligation (CDO), which were assigned safe ratings by the credit rating agencies. In effect, Wall Street connected this pool of money to the mortgage market in the U.S., with enormous fees accruing to those throughout the mortgage supply chain, from the mortgage broker selling the loans, to small banks that funded the brokers, to the giant investment banks behind them. By approximately 2003, the supply of mortgages originated at traditional lending standards had been exhausted. However, continued strong demand for MBS and CDO began to drive down lending standards, as long as mortgages could still be sold along the supply chain. Eventually, this speculative bubble proved unsustainable.

== Boom and collapse of the shadow banking system ==
=== Significance of the parallel banking system ===
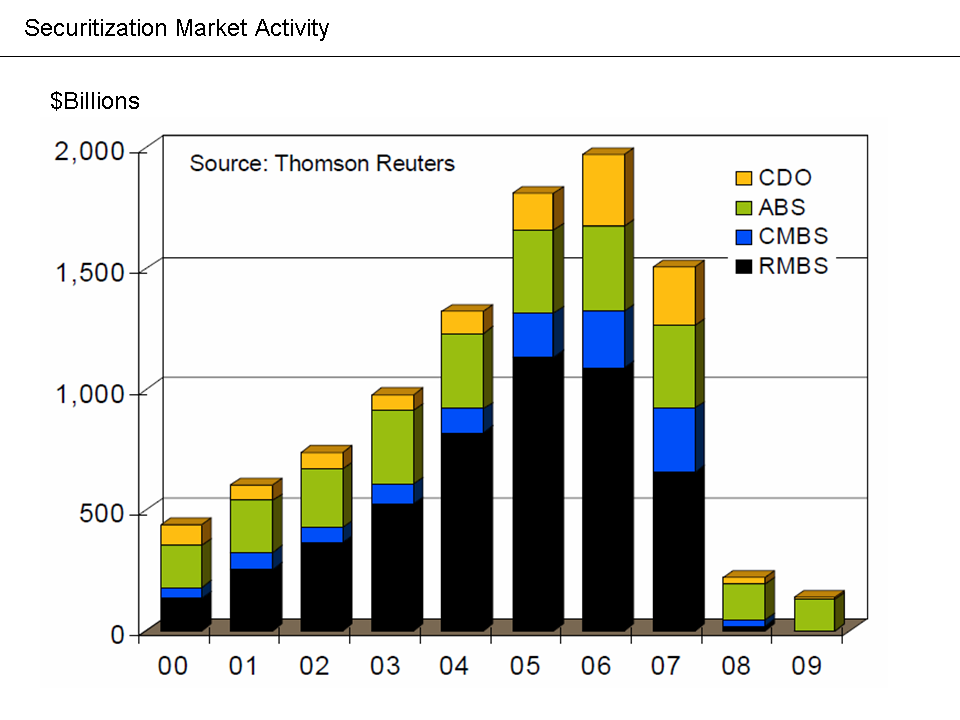
Securitization markets were impaired during the crisis

In a June 2008 speech, U.S. treasury secretary Timothy Geithner, then president and CEO of the NY Federal Reserve Bank, placed significant blame for the freezing of credit markets on a "run" on the entities in the "parallel" banking system, also called the shadow banking system. These entities became critical to the credit markets underpinning the financial system, but were not subject to the same regulatory controls. Further, these entities were vulnerable because they borrowed short-term in liquid markets to purchase long-term, illiquid and risky assets. This meant that disruptions in credit markets would make them subject to rapid deleveraging, selling their long-term assets at depressed prices. He described the significance of these entities: "In early 2007, asset-backed commercial paper conduits, in structured investment vehicles, in auction-rate preferred securities, tender option bonds and variable rate demand notes, had a combined asset size of roughly $2.2 trillion. Assets financed overnight in triparty repo grew to $2.5 trillion. Assets held in hedge funds grew to roughly $1.8 trillion. The combined balance sheets of the then five major investment banks totaled $4 trillion. In comparison, the total assets of the top five bank holding companies in the United States at that point were just over $6 trillion, and total assets of the entire banking system were about $10 trillion." He stated that the "combined effect of these factors was a financial system vulnerable to self-reinforcing asset price and credit cycles."

=== Run on the shadow banking system ===
Nobel laureate and liberal political columnist Paul Krugman described the run on the shadow banking system as the "core of what happened" to cause the crisis. "As the shadow banking system expanded to rival or even surpass conventional banking in importance, politicians and government officials should have realized that they were re-creating the kind of financial vulnerability that made the Great Depression possible—and they should have responded by extending regulations and the financial safety net to cover these new institutions. Influential figures should have proclaimed a simple rule: anything that does what a bank does, anything that has to be rescued in crises the way banks are, should be regulated like a bank." He referred to this lack of controls as "malign neglect." Some researchers have suggested that competition between GSEs and the shadow banking system led to a deterioration in underwriting standards.

For example, investment bank Bear Stearns was required to replenish much of its funding in overnight markets, making the firm vulnerable to credit market disruptions. When concerns arose regarding its financial strength, its ability to secure funds in these short-term markets was compromised, leading to the equivalent of a bank run. Over four days, its available cash declined from $18 billion to $3 billion as investors pulled funding from the firm. It collapsed and was sold at a fire-sale price to bank JP Morgan Chase 16 March 2008.

More than a third of the private credit markets thus became unavailable as a source of funds. In February 2009, Ben Bernanke stated that securitization markets remained effectively shut, with the exception of conforming mortgages, which could be sold to Fannie Mae and Freddie Mac.

The Economist reported in March 2010: "Bear Stearns and Lehman Brothers were non-banks that were crippled by a silent run among panicky overnight "repo" lenders, many of them money market funds uncertain about the quality of securitized collateral they were holding. Mass redemptions from these funds after Lehman's failure froze short-term funding for big firms."

== Mortgage compensation model, executive pay and bonuses ==
During the boom period, enormous fees were paid to those throughout the mortgage supply chain, from the mortgage broker selling the loans, to small banks that funded the brokers, to the giant investment banks behind them. Those originating loans were paid fees for selling them, regardless of how the loans performed. Default or credit risk was passed from mortgage originators to investors using various types of financial innovation. This became known as the "originate to distribute" model, as opposed to the traditional model where the bank originating the mortgage retained the credit risk. In effect, the mortgage originators were left with nothing at risk, giving rise to a moral hazard that separated behavior and consequence.

Economist Mark Zandi described moral hazard as a root cause of the subprime mortgage crisis. He wrote: "...the risks inherent in mortgage lending became so widely dispersed that no one was forced to worry about the quality of any single loan. As shaky mortgages were combined, diluting any problems into a larger pool, the incentive for responsibility was undermined." He also wrote: "Finance companies weren't subject to the same regulatory oversight as banks. Taxpayers weren't on the hook if they went belly up [pre-crisis], only their shareholders and other creditors were. Finance companies thus had little to discourage them from growing as aggressively as possible, even if that meant lowering or winking at traditional lending standards."

The New York State Comptroller's Office has said that in 2006, Wall Street executives took home bonuses totaling $23.9 billion. "Wall Street traders were thinking of the bonus at the end of the year, not the long-term health of their firm. The whole system—from mortgage brokers to Wall Street risk managers—seemed tilted toward taking short-term risks while ignoring long-term obligations. The most damning evidence is that most of the people at the top of the banks didn't really understand how those [investments] worked."

Investment banker incentive compensation was focused on fees generated from assembling financial products, rather than the performance of those products and profits generated over time. Their bonuses were heavily skewed towards cash rather than stock and not subject to "claw-back" (recovery of the bonus from the employee by the firm) in the event the MBS or CDO created did not perform. In addition, the increased risk (in the form of financial leverage) taken by the major investment banks was not adequately factored into the compensation of senior executives.

Bank CEO Jamie Dimon argued: "Rewards have to track real, sustained, risk-adjusted performance. Golden parachutes, special contracts, and unreasonable perks must disappear. There must be a relentless focus on risk management that starts at the top of the organization and permeates down to the entire firm. This should be business-as-usual, but at too many places, it wasn't."

== Regulation and deregulation ==
Critics have argued that the regulatory framework did not keep pace with financial innovation, such as the increasing importance of the shadow banking system, derivatives and off-balance sheet financing. In other cases, laws were changed or enforcement weakened in parts of the financial system. Several critics have argued that the most critical role for regulation is to make sure that financial institutions have the ability or capital to deliver on their commitments. Critics have also noted de facto deregulation through a shift in market share toward the least regulated portions of the mortgage market.

Key examples of regulatory failures include:

- In 1999, the Republican controlled 106th Congress U.S. Congress under the Clinton administration passed the Gramm-Leach-Bliley Act, which repealed part of the Glass–Steagall Act of 1933. This repeal has been criticized for reducing the separation between commercial banks (which traditionally had a conservative culture) and investment banks (which had a more risk-taking culture).
- In 2004, the Securities and Exchange Commission relaxed the net capital rule, which enabled investment banks to substantially increase the level of debt they were taking on, fueling the growth in mortgage-backed securities supporting subprime mortgages. The SEC has conceded that self-regulation of investment banks contributed to the crisis.
- Financial institutions in the shadow banking system are not subject to the same regulation as depository banks, allowing them to assume additional debt obligations relative to their financial cushion or capital base. This was the case despite the Long-Term capital Management debacle in 1998, where a highly leveraged shadow institution failed with systemic implications.
- Regulators and accounting standard-setters allowed depository banks such as Citigroup to move significant amounts of assets and liabilities off-balance sheet into complex legal entities called structured investment vehicles, masking the weakness of the capital base of the firm or degree of leverage or risk taken. One news agency estimated that the top four U.S. banks will have to return between $500 billion and $1 trillion to their balance sheets during 2009. This increased uncertainty during the crisis regarding the financial position of the major banks. Off-balance sheet entities were also used by Enron as part of the scandal that brought down that company in 2001.
- The U.S. Congress allowed the self-regulation of the derivatives market when it passed the Commodity Futures Modernization Act of 2000. Derivatives such as credit default swaps (CDS) can be used to hedge or speculate against particular credit risks. The volume of CDS outstanding increased 100-fold from 1998 to 2008, with estimates of the debt covered by CDS contracts, as of November 2008, ranging from US$33 to $47 trillion. Total over-the-counter (OTC) derivative notional value rose to $683 trillion by June 2008. Warren Buffett famously referred to derivatives as "financial weapons of mass destruction" in early 2003.

Author Roger Lowenstein summarized some of the regulatory problems that caused the crisis in November 2009:

"1) Mortgage regulation was too lax and in some cases nonexistent; 2) Capital requirements for banks were too low; 3) Trading in derivatives such as credit default swaps posed giant, unseen risks; 4) Credit ratings on structured securities such as collateralized-debt obligations were deeply flawed; 5) Bankers were moved to take on risk by excessive pay packages; 6) The government’s response to the crash also created, or exacerbated, moral hazard. Markets now expect that big banks won’t be allowed to fail, weakening the incentives of investors to discipline big banks and keep them from piling up too many risky assets again."

A 2011 documentary film, Heist: Who Stole the American Dream? argues that deregulation led to the crisis, and is geared towards a general audience.

== Conflicts of interest and lobbying ==
A variety of conflicts of interest have been argued as contributing to this crisis:

- Credit rating agencies are compensated for rating debt securities by those issuing the securities, who have an interest in seeing the most positive ratings applied. Further, changing the debt rating on a company that insures multiple debt securities such as AIG or MBIA, requires the re-rating of many other securities, creating significant costs. Despite taking on significantly more risk, AIG and MBIA retained the highest credit ratings until well into the crisis.
- There is a "revolving door" between major financial institutions, the Treasury Department, and Treasury bailout programs. For example, the former CEO of Goldman Sachs was Henry Paulson, who became President George W. Bush's Treasury Secretary. Although three of Goldman's key competitors either failed or were allowed to fail, it received $10 billion in Troubled Asset Relief Program (TARP) funds (which it has since paid back) and $12.9 billion in payments via AIG, while remaining highly profitable and paying enormous bonuses. The first two officials in charge of the TARP bailout program were also from Goldman.
- There is a "revolving door" between major financial institutions and the Securities and Exchange Commission (SEC), which is supposed to monitor them. For example, as of January 2009, the SEC's two most recent Directors of Enforcement had taken positions at powerful banks directly after leaving the role. The route into lucrative positions with banks places a financial incentive on regulators to maintain good relationships with those they monitor. This is sometimes referred to as regulatory capture.

Banks in the U.S. lobby politicians extensively. A November 2009 report from economists of the International Monetary Fund (IMF) writing independently of that organization indicated that:

- Thirty-three legislative proposals that would have increased regulatory scrutiny over banks were the targets of intense and successful lobbying;

The study concluded that: "the prevention of future crises might require weakening political influence of the financial industry or closer monitoring of lobbying activities to understand better the incentives behind it."

The Boston Globe reported during that during January–June 2009, the largest four U.S. banks spent these amounts ($ millions) on lobbying, despite receiving taxpayer bailouts: Citigroup $3.1; JP Morgan Chase $3.1; Bank of America $1.5; and Wells Fargo $1.4.

The New York Times reported in April 2010: "An analysis by Public Citizen found that at least 70 former members of Congress were lobbying for Wall Street and the financial services sector last year, including two former Senate majority leaders (Trent Lott and Bob Dole), two former House majority leaders (Richard A. Gephardt and Dick Armey) and a former House speaker (J. Dennis Hastert). In addition to the lawmakers, data from OpenSecrets counted 56 former congressional aides on the Senate or House banking committees who went on to use their expertise to lobby for the financial sector."

The Financial Crisis Inquiry Commission reported in January 2011 that "...from 1998 to 2008, the financial sector expended $2.7 billion in reported federal lobbying expenses; individuals and political action committees in the sector made more than $1 billion in campaign contributions."

=== Role of business leaders ===
A 2012 book by Hedrick Smith, Who Stole the American Dream?, suggests that the Powell Memo was instrumental in setting a new political direction for US business leaders that led to "America’s contemporary economic malaise."

== Other factors ==
=== Commodity price volatility ===
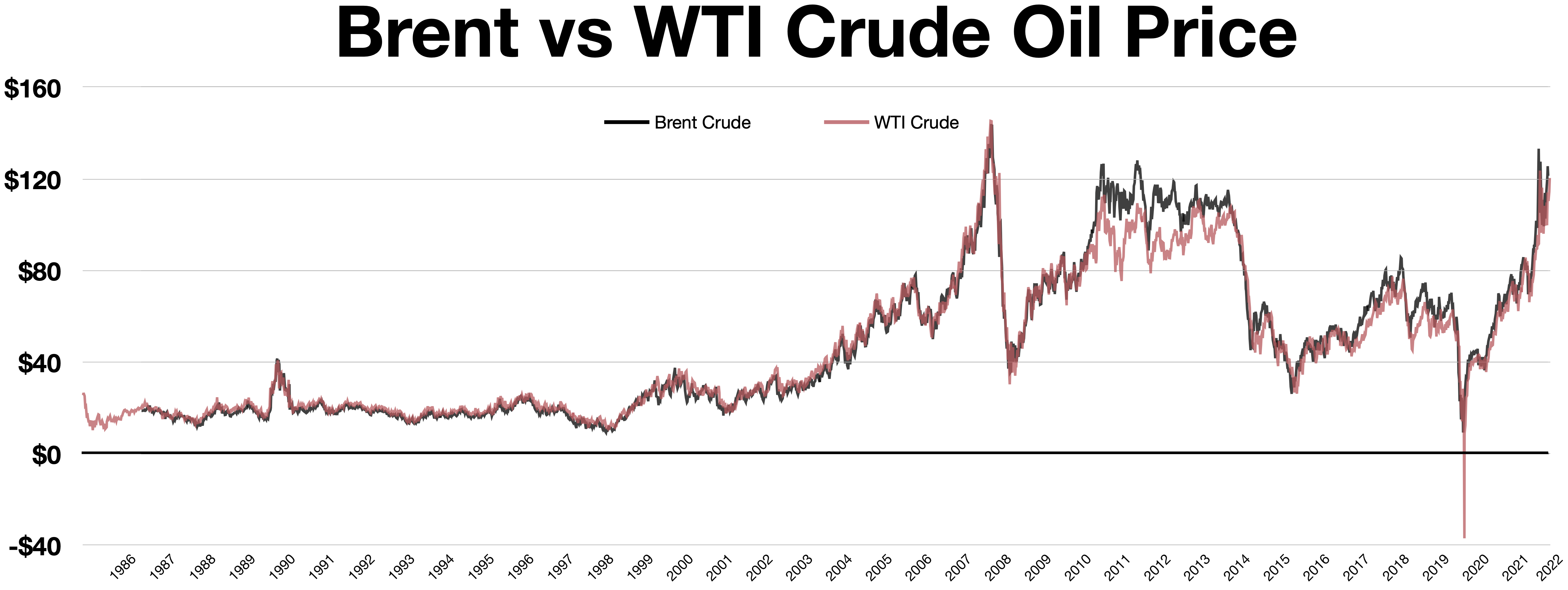
Brent Crude West Texas Intermediate

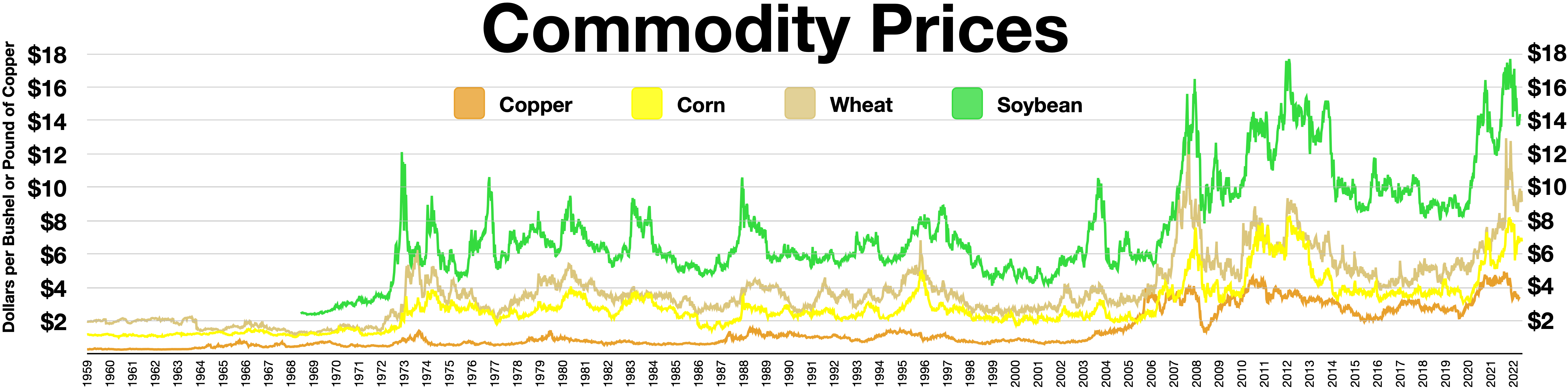
Commodity Prices soybean wheat corn copper

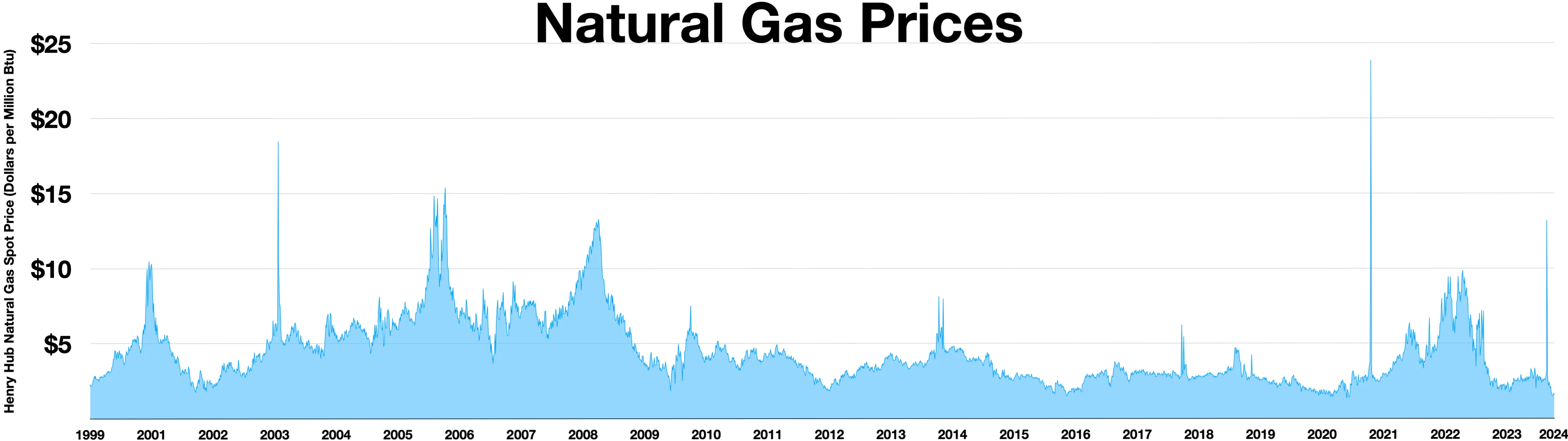
Natural gas prices Henry Hub

A commodity price bubble was created following the collapse in the housing bubble. The price of oil nearly tripled from $50 to $140 from early 2007 to 2008, before plunging during the Great Recession. Experts debate the causes, which include the flow of money from housing and other investments into commodities to speculation and monetary policy. An increase in oil prices tends to divert a larger share of consumer spending into gasoline, which creates downward pressure on economic growth in oil importing countries, as wealth flows to oil-producing states. Spiking instability in the price of oil over the decade leading up to the price high of 2008 has also been proposed as a causal factor in the 2008 financial crisis.

=== Inaccurate economic forecasting ===
A cover story in BusinessWeek magazine claims that economists mostly failed to predict the worst international economic crisis since the Great Depression of the 1930s. The Wharton School of the University of Pennsylvania online business journal examines why economists failed to predict a major global financial crisis. But in fact, a 2009 paper identifies twelve economists and commentators who, between 2000 and 2006, predicted a recession based on the collapse of the then-booming housing market in the United States: Dean Baker, Wynne Godley, Fred Harrison, Michael Hudson, Eric Janszen, Med Jones Steve Keen, Jakob Brøchner Madsen, Jens Kjaer Sørensen, Kurt Richebächer, Nouriel Roubini, Peter Schiff, and Robert Shiller. An article in The New York Times informs that Roubini warned of such crisis as early as September 2006, and the article goes on to state that the profession of economics is bad at predicting recessions. According to The Guardian, Roubini was ridiculed for predicting a collapse of the housing market and worldwide recession, while The New York Times labelled him "Dr. Doom". However, there are examples of other experts who gave indications of a financial crisis.

The failure to forecast the "Great Recession" has caused a lot of soul searching in the economics profession. The Queen of the United Kingdom asked why had nobody noticed that the credit crunch was on its way, and a group of economists—experts from business, the City, its regulators, academia, and government—tried to explain in a letter.

=== Over-leveraging, credit default swaps and collateralized debt obligations as causes ===
Public debt as a percent of GDP (2007).

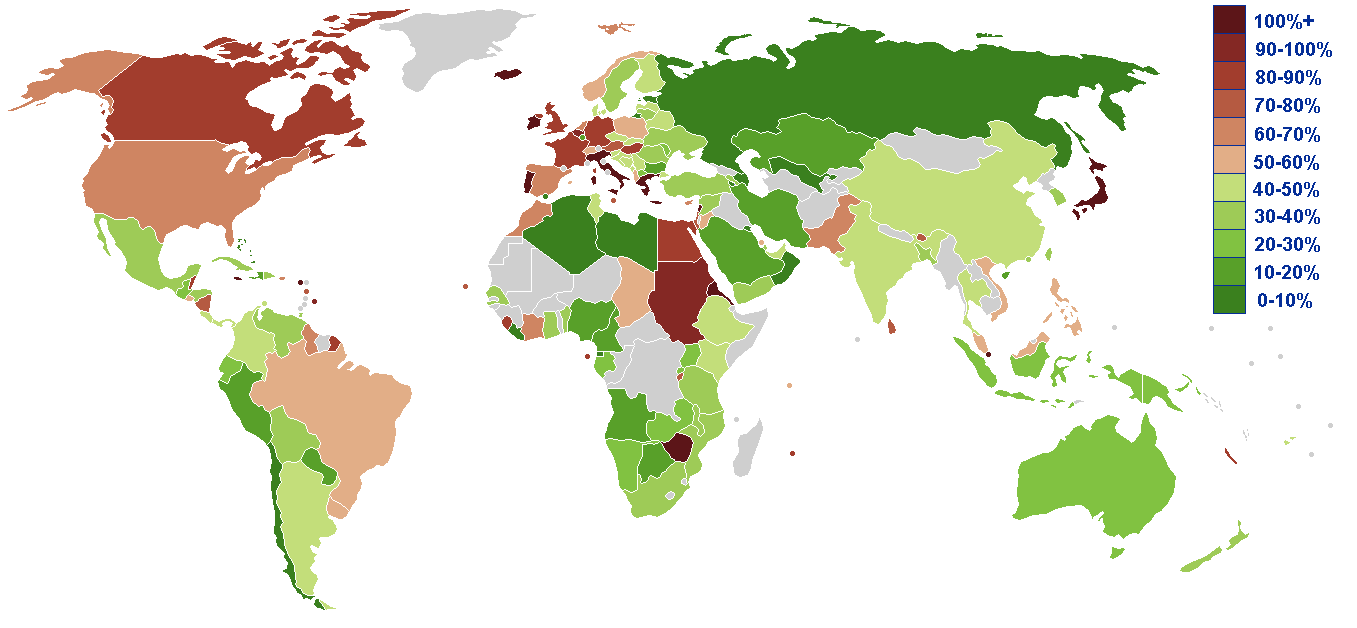
Public debt as a percent of GDP (2009/2010).

Another probable cause of the crisis—and a factor that unquestionably amplified its magnitude—was widespread miscalculation by banks and investors of the level of risk inherent in the unregulated collateralized debt obligation and credit default swap markets. Under this theory, banks and investors systematized the risk by taking advantage of low interest rates to borrow tremendous sums of money that they could only pay back if the housing market continued to increase in value.

According to an article published in Wired, the risk was further systematized by the use of David X. Li's Gaussian copula model function to rapidly price collateralized debt obligations based on the price of related credit default swaps. Because it was highly tractable, it rapidly came to be used by a huge percentage of CDO and CDS investors, issuers, and rating agencies. According to one wired.com article: "Then the model fell apart. Cracks started appearing early on, when financial markets began behaving in ways that users of Li's formula hadn't expected. The cracks became full-fledged canyons in 2008—when ruptures in the financial system's foundation swallowed up trillions of dollars and put the survival of the global banking system in serious peril...Li's Gaussian copula formula will go down in history as instrumental in causing the unfathomable losses that brought the world financial system to its knees."

The pricing model for CDOs clearly did not reflect the level of risk they introduced into the system. It has been estimated that the "from late 2005 to the middle of 2007, around $450bn of CDO of ABS were issued, of which about one third were created from risky mortgage-backed bonds...[o]ut of that pile, around $305bn of the CDOs are now in a formal state of default, with the CDOs underwritten by Merrill Lynch accounting for the biggest pile of defaulted assets, followed by UBS and Citi." The average recovery rate for high quality CDOs has been approximately 32 cents on the dollar, while the recovery rate for mezzanine CDO's has been approximately five cents for every dollar. These massive, practically unthinkable, losses have dramatically impacted the balance sheets of banks across the globe, leaving them with very little capital to continue operations.

=== Oil prices ===
Economist James D. Hamilton has argued that the increase in oil prices in the period of 2007 through 2008 was a significant cause of the recession. He evaluated several different approaches to estimating the impact of oil price shocks on the economy, including some methods that had previously shown a decline in the relationship between oil price shocks and the overall economy. All of these methods "support a common conclusion; had there been no increase in oil prices between 2007:Q3 and 2008:Q2, the US economy would not have been in a recession over the period 2007:Q4 through 2008:Q3." Hamilton's own model, a time-series econometric forecast based on data up to 2003, showed that the decline in GDP could have been successfully predicted to almost its full extent given knowledge of the price of oil. The results imply that oil prices were entirely responsible for the recession. Hamilton acknowledged that this was probably not the entire cause but maintained that it showed that oil price increases made a significant contribution to the downturn in economic growth.

=== Overproduction ===
It has also been debated that the root cause of the crisis is overproduction of goods caused by globalization. Overproduction tends to cause deflation and signs of deflation were evident in October and November 2008, as commodity prices tumbled and the Federal Reserve was lowering its target rate to an all-time-low 0.25%. On the other hand, ecological economist Herman Daly suggests that it is not actually an economic crisis, but rather a crisis of exceeding growth beyond sustainable ecological limits. This reflects a claim made in the 1972 book Limits to Growth, which stated that without major deviation from the policies followed in the 20th century, a permanent end of economic growth could be reached sometime in the first two decades of the 21st century, due to gradual depletion of natural resources.

== Sources ==
- Black, William K. (2005). The Best Way to Rob a Bank Is to Own One. University of Texas Press. ISBN 978-0-292-72139-5.
