= Jakob B. Madsen =

Danish economist

Jakob Brøchner Madsen
- Born: Randers, Denmark

Academic work
- Discipline: Economics, finance
- Website: Information at IDEAS / RePEc

Jakob Brøchner Madsen is an economist, professor and former financial analyst and deputy chief economist (Bank of Jutland). He was one of few economists who predicted the IT bubble in 2001 and the 2000s United States housing bubble and the 2008 financial crisis. In 2006 he and Jens Kjaer Sørensen wrote: "The bursting of this housing bubble will have a severe impact on the world economy and may even result in a recession."

== Biography ==
He was ranked as number 949 in the world of the 55000+ economists who published at least one JEL classified article over the period from 1994 to 1998, according to a study funded by the European Economic Association.
