= Kurt Richebächer =

German banker and economist (1918–2007)

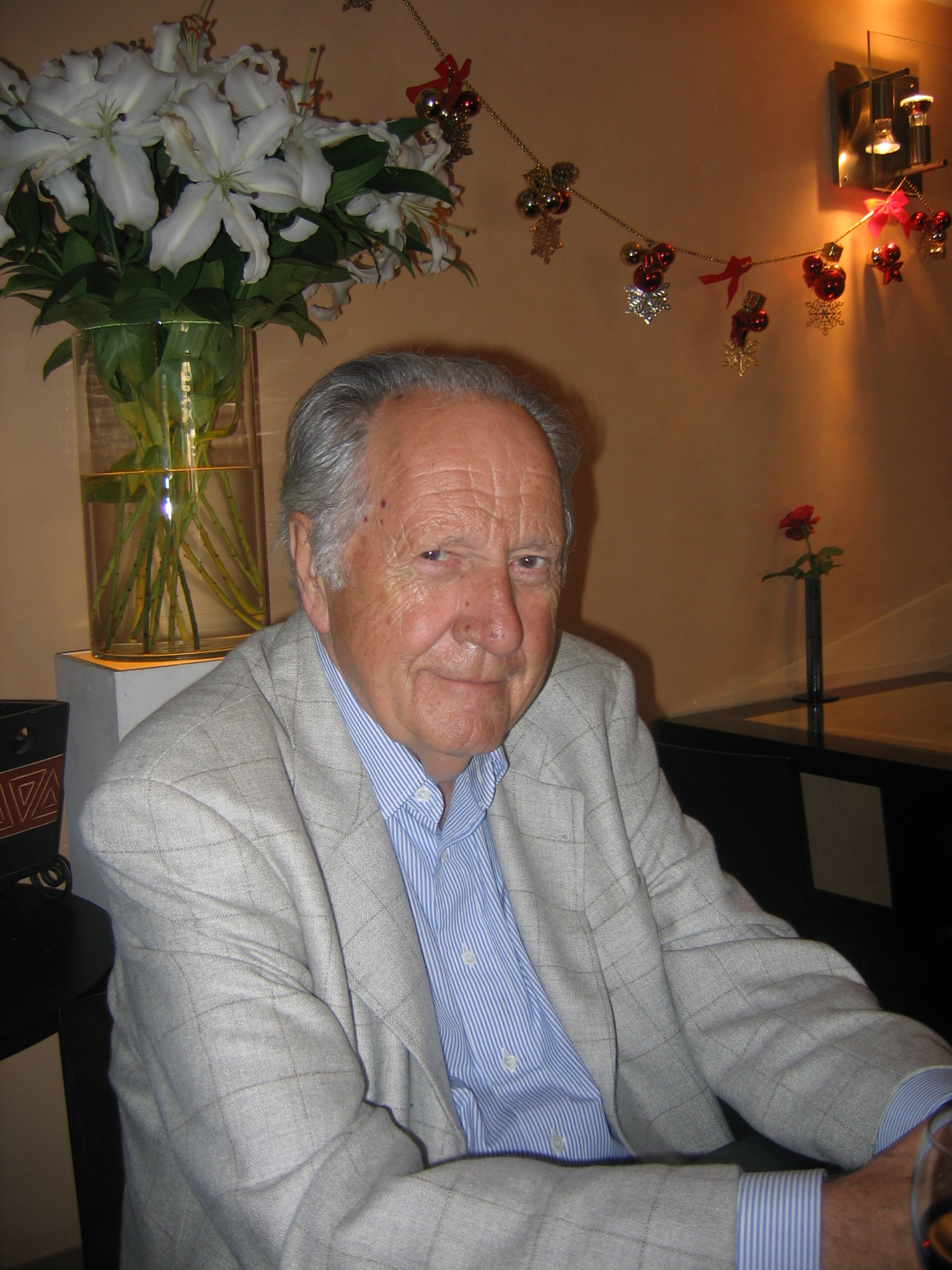
Dr. Kurt Richebacher at his home in Cannes, France 2007

Kurt Richebächer (1918 – 24 August 2007) was a German banker and economist. He was born in Karlsruhe, Germany. He studied business economics in Berlin and completed is doctoral at the University of Heidelberg in 1945. He began his career as a journalist, before becoming an international banker and economist. He considered himself a follower of the Austrian School of Economics and was best known for his newsletter, "The Richebächer Letter," which at various times also circulated as "Currencies & Credit Markets."

Richebächer's father sent him to Great Britain before World War II to improve his fluency in the English language. He also wanted to gain an appreciation of what was required in a career in journalism. While in London, he developed a fascination with the study of economics. He returned to study in Berlin, and received a doctorate in Economics after the war.

== Post-war years ==
From 1945 to 1958, Richebächer was a economics journalist/commentator. Richebächer was one of the journalists covering Konrad Adenauer's 1955 visit to Moscow to reestablish diplomatic ties between the Soviet Union and the Federal Republic of Germany. In 1957 he went to London to become a commentator on British economic policy. In 1964, he was appointed to the position of post of chief economist and managing director of Dresdner Bank, in Frankfurt. Richebächer provided economic advice to the clients of his employer. However, he was sometimes critical of the economic policy of the government of Helmut Schmidt. His supervisor, Jürgen Ponto, continued to support Richebächer's activities in researching and providing what he deemed to be accurate and correct economic commentary.

In 1977, Ponto was the victim of a kidnap attempt by the left wing organization known as the Red Army Faction. This resulted in Ponto's murder. Some time after this event, Richebächer decided to leave DresdnerBank and offer his insight on a freelance basis. His farewell event at DresdnerBank, was attended by many prominent economists and bankers including Paul Volcker who was then President of the New York Federal Reserve Bank, and John Exter, a former member of the New York Fed, advisor to Central Banks and father of the Inverted Pyramid of Assets.

In 1980 he published a book titled: "Im Teufelskreis der Wirtschaftpolitik" (publisher: Bonn Aktuell Gmbh), which provides a historical exploration of financial and economic crisis and explores the shift from free markets to what he considered – fiscal socialism.

During the last years of his life, Richebächer lived in France. He published a financial commentary service to subscribers titled "The Richebächer Letter", and made occasional contributions to the libertarian website "dailyreckoning.com". Richebacher was known for his frequently bearish views on the U.S. and global economies and his distrust of Wall Street's speculative excesses. He is considered a member of the Austrian Economists and owes a great deal to Ludwig von Mises, Friedrich Hayek and Exter.

In 2006, before the Great Recession, he commented: "A recession and bear market in asset prices are inevitable for the U.S. economy... All remaining questions pertain solely to speed, depth and duration of the economy's downturn."

Richebächer died on August 24, 2007, at the age of 88.

== Published books ==
- Börse Und Kapitalmarkt. Frankfurt (am Main): Knapp 1971. 4th ed, OCLC 264135352
  - Review : Kasten, Hans. "Book Review: Börse Und Kapitalmarkt." FinanzArchiv / Public Finance Analysis. 24.2 (1965): 376.
- Capital Markets Study: Functioning of capital markets. Paris & London: OECD H.M.S.O, 1968 ISBN 978-0119201376
- Dermitzel, Günther, Walter Damm, and Kurt Richebächer. Das Bankwesen Im Gemeinsamen Markt. Baden-Baden: August Lutzeyer, 1962 OCLC 781988389
- Richebächer, Kurt. Im Teufels Kreis Der Wirtschaftspolitik: Fiskalsozialismus Verdrängt Die Marktwirtschaft. Stuttgart: Aktuell, 1980. OCLC 657954513
