= Med Jones =

American economist

Med Jones (also known as Med Yones) is an American economist and strategist. He currently serves as the president of the International Institute of Management, a think tank and research organization based in the United States, focused on government, business, and investment strategies. He also serve as an advisory board member at its education subsidiary, the Executive Education Institute.

== Career ==
=== The Great Recession of 2008 ===
Med Jones is an economist who predicted the Great Recession of 2008, which stemmed from the 2000s United States housing bubble, the subprime mortgage crisis, and the 2008 financial crisis. In a 2006 white paper, he identified the housing bubble and consumer debt as the major U.S. economic risks between 2007 and 2017. In March 2007, Reuters interviewed Jones, who stated that the impact of subprime mortgages would extend beyond the housing sector and warned of the bursting of the housing bubble, high consumer debt, increased bankruptcies, a stock market crash, and a loss of confidence in the U.S. economy.

"In Rational Investing, published by Columbia University Press, Hugues Langlois of HEC Paris and Jacques Lussier, chief investment strategist at Desjardins Global Asset Management, reviewed warnings issued before the 2008 financial crisis by Med Jones, Dean Baker, Nouriel Roubini, and Peter Schiff. They found that, although all four had warned of the crisis, only Jones had a consistently accurate forecasting record, while the others showed mixed results outside that period.

In a January 2009 interview, he identified Groupthink dynamics as the main reason why mainstream economists overlooked the Global Financial Crisis (GFC). He also warned about major potential risks but forecasted that "the general economic decline cycle will bottom in 2009, and we could see stability sometime late 2009 or early 2010, then we will be back to modest recovery in late 2010 or early 2011." Despite the potential risks and general pessimism of Wall Street and many mainstream economists at the time, he believed that the US government had "the knowledge and the tools to mitigate those risks."

=== Gross National Happiness Index ===
The term Gross National Happiness (GNH) was coined in 1972 by Dutch pioneer and fourth president of the European Commission, Sicco Mansholt. GNH is often misattributed to Bhutan's fourth King, Jigme Singye Wangchuck, who popularized the concept in the late 1990s. The GNH philosophy suggests that promoting happiness is the ideal purpose of governments. Implementing this philosophy has been challenging due to the subjective nature of happiness, the lack of an exact quantitative definition of GNH, and the absence of a practical model to measure the impact of economic policies on citizens' subjective well-being.

In 2005, Jones introduced the first Gross National Happiness Index (GNH Index), also known as the Gross National Well-being Index (GNW Index). A year later, in 2006, he published a white paper titled "The American Pursuit of Unhappiness," urging policymakers, economists, and researchers to incorporate the happiness and wellbeing framework into policy making and measurement . The initiative was referenced in academic and research papers in many countries citing the GNH Index as a model for economic development and measurement.

Several very similar econometric frameworks, happiness and wellbeing indices, and government policy initiative were launched by private and public sectors actors. For example, in 2008 Bhutan launched an almost identical "GNH Index" framework with added religious measurement variables.

In 2009, in the United States, the Gallup poll system launched a happiness survey and collected data nationally. The Gallup Well-Being Index was modeled after the GNH Index framework of 2005. The Well-Being Index score is an average of six sub-indices measuring life evaluation, emotional health, work environment, physical health, healthy behaviors, and access to basic necessities - also similar to the first GNH index variables. In October 2009, the USA scored 66.1/100. The GNH Index framework continued to influence subsequent initiatives. In a 2012 report prepared for US Congressman Hansen Clarke, researchers Ben Beachy and Juston Zorn at the John F. Kennedy School of Government at Harvard University recommended that "the Congress should prescribe the broad parameters of new, carefully designed supplemental national indicators; it should launch a bipartisan commission of experts to address unresolved methodological issues and include alternative indicators." They proposed that the government could use survey results to identify which well-being dimensions are least satisfied and which districts and demographic groups are most deficient, to allocate resources accordingly. The report listed the GNH Index and its seven measurement areas as one of the main frameworks to consider. That year, Professor Peter T. Coleman, director of the International Center for Cooperation and Conflict Resolution at Columbia University, suggested that Jones' GNH Index initiative could guide the development of the Global Peace Index Initiative (GPI).

In 2012, South Korea launched the Happiness Index, citing the GNH Index framework.

In 2012, the government of Goa, India, cited the GNH Index framework as a model for measuring happiness in its 2030 Vision and Roadmap.

In his book (2012) the "In Pursuit of Personal and Political Happiness", Alastair Campbell Strategy & Communication Director of the Prime Minister of Britain Tony Blair, called upon the United Kingdom's Prime Minister David Cameron and France's President Nicolas Sarkozy to implement a new happiness and well being measurement policy similar to that of Med Jones' first GNH Index. Soon after the United Kingdom also launched its own well-being and happiness statistics.

Other noteworthy Happiness and Well-being Index initiatives that followed the first GNH Index, include the Organization for Economic Co-operation and Development (OECD) Better Life Index in 2011 and the first World Happiness Report in 2012, the UN General Assembly Resolution 65/309 in 2011, and the Social Progress Index (SPI) in 2013. All advocating similar happiness and wellbeing measurement econometric framework and policy initiatives.

In 2014, the government of Dubai launched its localized Happiness Index to measure public contentment and satisfaction with government services.

== Political views ==
Med Jones identifies as an independent non-partisan strategist.
