= Net capital rule =

1975 SEC regulation governing securities pricing; noted for a 2004 amendment

The uniform net capital rule is a rule created by the U.S. Securities and Exchange Commission ("SEC") in 1975 to regulate directly the ability of broker-dealers to meet their financial obligations to customers and other creditors. Broker-dealers are companies that trade securities for customers (i.e., brokers) and for their own accounts (i.e., dealers).

The rule requires those firms to value their securities at market prices and to apply to those values a haircut (i.e., a discount) based on each security's risk characteristics. The haircut values of securities are used to compute the liquidation value of a broker-dealer's assets to determine whether the broker-dealer holds enough liquid assets to pay all its non-subordinated liabilities and to still retain a "cushion" of required liquid assets (i.e., the "net capital" requirement) to ensure payment of all obligations owed to customers if there is a delay in liquidating the assets.

On April 28, 2004, the SEC voted unanimously to permit the largest broker-dealers (i.e., those with "tentative net capital" of more than $5 billion) to apply for exemptions from this established "haircut" method. Upon receiving SEC approval, those firms were permitted to use mathematical models to compute the haircuts on their securities based on international standards used by commercial banks.

Since 2008, many commentators on the 2008 financial crisis have identified the 2004 rule change as an important contributor to the crisis on the basis it permitted certain large investment banks (i.e., Bear Stearns, Goldman Sachs, Lehman Brothers, Merrill Lynch, and Morgan Stanley) to increase dramatically their leverage (i.e., the ratio of their debt or assets to their equity). Financial reports filed by those companies show an increase in their leverage ratios from 2004 through 2007 (and into 2008), but financial reports filed by the same companies before 2004 show higher reported leverage ratios for four of the five firms in years before 2004.

The 2004 rule change remains in effect. The companies that received SEC approval to use its haircut computation method continue to use that method, subject to modifications that became effective January 1, 2010.

== The net capital rule and the 2008 financial crisis ==
=== 2008 explanation ===
Beginning in 2008, many observers remarked that the 2004 change to the SEC's net capital rule permitted investment banks to increase their leverage and this played a central role in the 2008 financial crisis.

This position appears to have been first described by Lee A. Pickard, Director of the SEC's Division of Market Regulation (the former name of the current Division of Trading and Markets) at the time the SEC's uniform net capital rule was adopted in 1975. In an August 8, 2008, commentary, Mr. Pickard wrote that before the 2004 rule change, broker-dealers were limited in the amount of debt they could incur, to a ratio of about 12 times their net capital, but that they operated at significantly lower ratios. He concluded that, if they had been subject to the net capital rule as it existed before the 2004 rule change, broker-dealers would not have been able to incur their high debt levels without first having increased their capital bases. In what became a widely cited September 18, 2008, New York Sun article (the "2008 NY Sun Article"), Mr. Pickard was quoted as stating the SEC's 2004 rule change was the primary reason large losses were incurred at investment banks.

Perhaps the most influential review of the 2004 rule change was an October 3, 2008, front page New York Times article titled "Agency's '04 Rule Let Banks Pile Up New Debt" (the "2008 NY Times Article"). That article explained the net capital rule applied to the "brokerage units" of investment banks and stated the 2004 rule change created "an exemption" from an old rule that limited the amount of debt they could take on. According to the article, the rule change unshackled "billions of dollars held in reserve against losses" and led to investment banks dramatically increasing their leverage.

In late 2008 and early 2009, prominent scholars such as Alan Blinder, John Coffee, Niall Ferguson, and Joseph Stiglitz explained (1) the old net capital rule limited investment bank leverage (defined as the ratio of debt to equity) to 12 (or 15) to 1 and (2) following the 2004 rule change, which relaxed or eliminated this restriction, investment bank leverage increased dramatically to 30 and even 40 to 1 or more. The investment bank leverage cited by these scholars was the leverage reported by the Consolidated Supervised Entity Holding Companies in their financial reports filed with the SEC.

Daniel Gross wrote in Slate magazine: "Going public allowed investment banks to get bigger, which then gave them the heft to mold the regulatory system to their liking. Perhaps the most disastrous decision of the past decade was the Securities and Exchange Commission's 2004 rule change allowing investment banks to increase the amount of debt they could take on their books—a move made at the request of the Gang of Five's CEOs." He was referring to the net capital rule change.

=== SEC response ===
In connection with an investigation into the SEC's role in the collapse of Bear Stearns, in late September, 2008, the SEC's Division of Trading and Markets responded to an early formulation of this position by maintaining (1) it confuses leverage at the Bear Stearns holding company, which was never regulated by the net capital rule, with leverage at the broker-dealer subsidiaries covered by the net capital rule, and (2) before and after the 2004 rule change the broker-dealers covered by the 2004 rule change were subject to a net capital requirement equal to 2% of customer receivables not a 12 to 1 leverage test.

In an April 9, 2009, speech ("2009 Sirri Speech") Erik Sirri, then Director of the SEC's Division of Trading and Markets, expanded on this explanation by stating (1) the 2004 rule change did not affect the "basic" net capital rule that had a leverage limit (albeit one that excluded much broker-dealer debt), (2) an "alternative" net capital rule established in 1975 that did not contain a direct leverage limit applied to the broker-dealer subsidiaries of the five largest investment banks (and other large broker-dealers), and (3) neither form of the net capital rule was designed (nor operated) to constrain leverage at the investment bank holding company level, where leverage and, more important, risk was concentrated in business units other than broker-dealer subsidiaries.

In a July 2009 report, the Government Accountability Office ("GAO") reported that SEC staff had stated to the GAO that (1) CSE Brokers did not take on larger proprietary positions after applying reduced haircuts to those positions under the 2004 rule change and (2) leverage at those CSE Brokers was driven by customer margin loans, repurchase agreements, and stock lending, which were marked daily and secured by collateral that exposed the CSE Brokers to little if any risk. The report also stated officials at a former CSE Holding Company told the GAO they did not join the CSE program to increase leverage. The GAO confirmed that leverage at the CSE Holding Companies had been higher at the end of 1998 than at the end of 2006, just before the 2008 financial crisis. The GAO report includes a comment letter from the SEC that reaffirms points raised in the 2009 Sirri Speech and states that commentators have "mischaracterized" the 2004 rule change as having allowed CSE Brokers to increase their leverage or as having been a major contributor to the 2008 financial crisis. The letter states that the CSE Broker "tentative net capital" levels "remained relatively stable after they began operating under the 2004 amendments, and, in some cases, increased significantly."

=== Status of 2004 rule change ===
It has been widely noted that all five of the investment bank holding companies affected by the 2004 rule change no longer exist as independent companies or have converted into bank holding companies. Less noted is that the five broker-dealers originally owned by those investment bank holding companies continue to compute their compliance with the SEC's net capital rule using the alternative net capital computation method established by the 2004 rule change. Under the 2004 rule change the difference is that those CSE Brokers (like Citigroup Global Markets Inc. and JP Morgan Securities Inc. before them) are now owned by bank holding companies subject to consolidated supervision by the Federal Reserve, not by the SEC under the CSE Program described below.

In her prepared testimony for a January 14, 2010, hearing before the Financial Crisis Inquiry Commission ("FCIC"), SEC Chair Mary Schapiro stated SEC staff had informed CSE Brokers in December 2009 that "they will require that these broker-dealers take standardized net capital charges on less liquid mortgage and other asset-backed securities positions rather than using financial models to calculate net capital requirements." In her prepared testimony for an April 20, 2010, hearing before the House Financial Services Committee, Chairman Schapiro repeated this explanation and added that the new requirements took effect January 1, 2010. She also stated the SEC was reviewing whether the "alternative net capital computation" system established by the 2004 rule change "should be substantially modified" and more generally whether minimum net capital requirements should be increased for all broker-dealers.

== Background to and adoption of net capital rule ==
The SEC's "Uniform Net Capital Rule" (the "Basic Method") was adopted in 1975 following a financial market and broker record-keeping crisis during the period from 1967 to 1970. In the same 1975 release that adopted the Basic Method, the SEC established the "Alternative Net Capital Requirement for Certain Brokers and Dealers" (the "Alternative Method"). The SEC had maintained a net capital rule since 1944, but had exempted broker-dealers subject to "more comprehensive" capital requirements imposed by identified exchanges such as the New York Stock Exchange (NYSE). The 1975 uniform net capital rule continued many features of the existing SEC net capital rule, but adopted other (more stringent) requirements of the NYSE net capital rule.

=== Rule applies to broker-dealers, not their parent holding companies ===
Both the Basic Method and the Alternative Method applied to broker-dealers. At no time did the SEC impose a net capital requirement on the holding company parent of a broker-dealer. Brokers buy and sell securities for the account of customers. The Securities Exchange Act of 1934 had given the SEC authority to regulate the financial condition of broker-dealers to provide customers some assurance that their broker could meet its obligations to them.

Holding companies that owned broker-dealers were treated like other "unregulated" companies to which parties extend credit based on their own judgments without the assurance provided by regulatory oversight of a company's financial condition. In practice, the "independent check" on such financial condition became the rating agencies. In order to conduct their dealer and other credit sensitive activities, the large investment bank holding companies managed their leverage and overall financial condition to achieve at least the "A" credit rating considered necessary for such activities. Each of the investment banks that became a CSE Holding Company stressed the importance of a "net leverage" measure that excluded collateralized customer financing arrangements and other "low risk" assets in determining "net assets." This net leverage ratio was used by one rating agency in assessing investment bank capital strength and produced a leverage ratio much lower than the "gross leverage" ratio computed from total assets and shareholders' equity.

== Goals and tests of net capital rule ==
=== Self liquidation principle ===
The SEC has stated the net capital rule is intended to require "every broker-dealer to maintain at all times specified minimum levels of liquid assets, or net capital, sufficient to enable a firm that falls below its minimum requirement to liquidate in an orderly fashion." The Basic Method tries to reach this goal by measuring such "liquid assets" of the broker-dealer against most of its unsecured indebtedness. The "liquid assets" serve as the "cushion" to cover full repayment of that unsecured debt. The Alternative Method instead measures the "liquid assets" against obligations owed by customers to the broker-dealer. The "liquid assets" serve as the "cushion" for the broker-dealer's recovery of the full amounts owed to it by customers.

Although the Basic and Alternative Methods end with these different tests, both begin by requiring a broker-dealer to compute its "net capital." To do so, the broker-dealer first computes its equity under Generally Accepted Accounting Principles ("GAAP") by marking to market securities and other assets and then reduces that computation by the amount of "illiquid assets" it holds. The broker-dealer adds to this total the amount of any "qualifying subordinated debt" it owes. This preliminary amount is the broker-dealer's "tentative net capital." After so computing "tentative net capital" the broker-dealer adjust that amount by making further reductions in the value of its securities based on percentage reductions ("haircuts") in their market value. The amount of the "haircut" applied to a security depends upon its perceived "risk characteristics." A stock portfolio, for example, would have a haircut of 15%, while a 30-year U.S. treasury bond, because it is less risky, would have a 6% haircut.

In theory, a calculation of "net capital" greater than zero would mean the "liquid assets" owned by a broker-dealer could be sold to repay all its obligations, even those not then due, other than any qualifying subordinated debt that the net capital rule treated as equity. Nevertheless, both the Basic and Alternative Method imposed a second step under which broker-dealers were required to compute a "cushion of liquid assets in excess of liabilities to cover potential market, credit, and other risks if they should be required to liquidate." This cushion could also be used to pay continuing operating costs while the broker-dealer liquidated, an issue particularly important for small broker-dealers with small absolute dollar amounts of required net capital.

Because the required net capital amount is a "cushion" or "buffer" to cover a broker-dealer's continuing operating costs as it liquidates and any exceptional losses in selling assets already discounted in computing net capital, the required level of net capital is measured against a much more limited amount of liabilities or assets than described (or assumed) by the commentators in Section 1.1 above. The "second step" in both the Basic Method and the Alternative Method makes this measurement.

=== Basic Method as partial unsecured debt limit ===
For this second step, the Basic Method adopted the traditional liability coverage test that had long been imposed by the New York Stock Exchange ("NYSE") and other "self regulatory" exchanges on their members and by the SEC on broker-dealers that were not members of such an exchange. Using that approach, the SEC required that a broker-dealer subject to the Basic Method maintain "net capital" equal to at least 6-2/3% of its "aggregate indebtedness." This is commonly referred to as a 15 to 1 leverage limit, because it meant "aggregate indebtedness" could not be more than 15 times the amount of "net capital." "Aggregate indebtedness", however, excluded "adequately secured debt", subordinated debt and other specified liabilities, so that even the Basic Method did not limit to 15 to 1 a broker-dealer's overall leverage computed from a GAAP financial statement.

In practice, broker-dealers are heavily financed through repurchase agreements and other forms of secured borrowing. Their leverage computed from a GAAP balance sheet would, therefore, usually be higher (possibly much higher) than the ratio of their "aggregate indebtedness" to "net capital", which is the "leverage" ratio tested by the Basic Method. This exclusion of secured debt from the "aggregate indebtedness" test is broader than, but similar to, the rating agency approach to excluding certain secured debt in computing net leverage described in Section 2.1 above.

=== Alternative Method as customer receivable limit ===
The Alternative Method was optional for broker-dealers that computed "aggregate debit items" owed by customers in accordance with the "customer reserve formula" established by the SEC's 1972 segregation rules for customer assets. Under its second step, a broker-dealer using the Alternative Method was required to maintain "net capital" equal to at least 4% of "aggregate debit items" owed by customers to the broker-dealer. This approach assumed receipts from amounts owed by customers would be used, along with the net capital cushion consisting of "liquid assets", to satisfy the broker-dealer's obligations to its customers, and to meet any administrative costs, in a liquidation of the broker-dealer's business. The net capital in the form of "liquid assets" of the broker-dealer, however, was not required to be separately escrowed for the exclusive benefit of customers.

The Alternative Method did not directly regulate the overall leverage of a broker-dealer. As the SEC explained in adopting the net capital rule, the Alternative Method "indicates to other creditors with whom the broker or dealer may deal what portion of its liquid assets in excess of that required to protect customers is available to meet other commitments of the broker or dealer."

In 1982 the net capital required under the Alternative Method was reduced to 2% of customer indebtedness. This meant customer receivables could not exceed 50 times the broker-dealers net capital. Neither at 2% nor at 4% required net capital did the resulting implicit 25 to 1 or 50 to 1 leverage limit on assets apply to a broker-dealer's overall assets. The 2% or 4% capital requirement was solely for customer assets (i.e., amounts owed by customers to the broker-dealer).

=== Early warning requirements ===
The 2009 Sirri Speech noted that the "early warning requirements" under the net capital rule were the "effective limits" for the CSE Brokers. Aside from the $5 billion tentative net capital reporting requirement established for CSE Brokers in the 2004 rule change, the SEC required before and after 2004 "early warning" notice to the SEC if a broker-dealer's net capital fell below a specified level higher than the required minimum that would trigger a broker-dealer liquidation. Upon providing such notice, a broker-dealer would become subject to closer supervision and would be prohibited from making capital distributions. Such distributions are also prohibited if they would trigger an early warning requirement.

Each broker-dealer was required to issue an "early warning" if its net capital dropped to less than 120% of the broker-dealer's absolute dollar minimum requirement. For broker-dealers using the Basic Method an "early warning" was required if their "aggregate indebtedness" became more than 12 times the amount of their "net capital." The 2009 Sirri Speech suggests this is the likely source for the widely stated proposition that broker-dealers were subject to a 12 to 1 leverage limit. For broker-dealers using the Alternative Method, such as all the CSE Brokers, there was an "early warning" requirement if their "aggregate debit items" became more than 20 times the amount of their net capital (i.e., if net capital did not at least equal 5% of aggregate debit items).

== Post-1975 experience under net capital rule ==
The uniform net capital rule was introduced in 1975 at a time of great change in the brokerage industry. The contemporaneous elimination of fixed commissions is often cited as reducing broker profitability and leading to a greater emphasis on "proprietary trading" and other "principal transactions."

=== Broker-dealer leverage increased after SEC enacted uniform net capital rule ===
Following enactment of the SEC's uniform net capital rule in 1975 reported overall leverage at broker-dealers increased. In a 1980 Release proposing changes in the "haircuts" used for net capital computations, the SEC noted aggregate broker-dealer leverage had increased from 7.44 and 7.45 to 1 debt to equity ratios in 1974 and 1975 to a ratio of 17.95 to 1 in 1979. The GAO found that by 1991 the average leverage ratio for thirteen large broker-dealers it studied was 27 to 1. The average among nine was even higher.

=== Large broker-dealers use Alternative Method ===
The same 1980 SEC Release noted a clear distinction in the application of the net capital rule. Most broker-dealers used the Basic Method. Large broker-dealers, which increasingly held the great majority of customer balances, used the Alternative Method. Reflecting this division, all of the large broker-dealers owned by investment bank holding companies that would become CSE Brokers after the 2004 rule change described below used the Alternative Method.

There are two recognized obstacles to adopting the Alternative Method. First, the $250,000 absolute minimum net capital requirement under the Alternative Method can be lower under the Basic Method if a broker-dealer limits its customer activities. This keeps many small broker-dealers from adopting the Alternative Method.

Second, to adopt the Alternative Method a broker-dealer must compute the "aggregate debit balances" owed by customers under the "customer reserve formula" specified by SEC Rule 15c3-3. Many small broker-dealers prefer to comply with one of the three exemptions from the Rule 15c3-3 requirements rather than create the operational capabilities to "fully compute" compliance with the customer reserve formula. These exemptions impose strict limits on a broker-dealers ability to handle customer funds and securities.

Neither consideration applied to the CSE Brokers. They held net capital in the billions, not hundreds of thousands, of dollars. They conducted customer brokerage activities that required full computation of the customer reserve formula under Rule 15c3-3. They used the Alternative Method and had done so for many years before the adoption of the CSE Program. This reduced their net capital requirement.

== 2004 change to net capital rule ==
In 2004 the SEC amended the net capital rule to permit broker-dealers with at least $5 billion in "tentative net capital" to apply for an "exemption" from the established method for computing "haircuts" and to compute their net capital by using historic data based mathematical models and scenario testing authorized for commercial banks by the "Basel Standards." According to Barry Ritholtz, this rule was known as the Bear Stearns exemption. This "exemption" from the traditional method for computing "haircuts" ultimately covered Bear Stearns, the four larger investment bank firms (i.e., Lehman Brothers, Merrill Lynch, Morgan Stanley and Goldman Sachs), and two commercial bank firms (i.e., Citigroup and JP Morgan Chase). It has been suggested Henry Paulson, the then chief executive officer of Goldman Sachs, "led" in "the lobbying charge" for the rule change permitting these "exemptions."

The SEC expected this change to significantly increase the amount of net capital computed by those broker-dealers. This would permit the parent holding companies of the broker-dealers to redeploy the resulting "excess" net capital in other lines of business. To lessen this effect, the SEC adopted a new $500 million minimum net capital (and $1 billion "tentative net capital") requirement for such brokers and, more important, required each to provide the SEC an "early warning" if its "tentative net capital" fell below $5 billion. Previously, their minimum net capital requirement was only $250,000 with an early warning requirement of $300,000, although the relevant minimums for such large broker-dealers were the much larger amounts resulting from the requirement to maintain net capital of 2% of aggregate debit items with an early warning requirement at 5% of aggregate debit balances. The SEC also permitted CSE Brokers to calculate "tentative net capital" by including "assets for which there is no ready market" to the extent the SEC approved the CSE Broker's use of mathematical models to determine haircuts for those positions.

=== Issues addressed by rule change ===
The 2004 change to the net capital rule responded to two issues. First, the European Union ("EU") had adopted in 2002 a Financial Conglomerate Directive that would become effective on January 1, 2005, after being enacted into law by member states in 2004. This Directive required supplemental supervision for unregulated financial (i.e., bank, insurance, or securities) holding companies that controlled regulated entities (such as a broker-dealer). If the relevant holding company was not located in an EU country, an EU member country could exempt the non-EU holding company from the supplemental supervision if it determined the holding company's home country provided "equivalent" supervision.

The second issue was whether and how to apply to broker-dealers capital standards based on those applicable internationally to competitors of US broker-dealers. Those standards (the "Basel Standards") had been established by the Basel Committee on Banking Supervision and had been the subject of a "concept release" issued by the SEC in 1997 concerning their application to the net capital rule.

In the United States there was no consolidated supervision for investment bank holding companies, only SEC supervision of their regulated broker-dealer subsidiaries and other regulated entities such as investment advisors. The Gramm-Leach-Bliley Act, which had eliminated the vestiges of the Glass–Steagall Act separating commercial and investment banking, had established an optional system for investment bank firms to register with the SEC as "Supervised Investment Bank Holding Companies." Commercial bank holding companies had long been subject to consolidated supervision by the Federal Reserve as "bank holding companies."

To address the approaching European consolidated supervision deadline, the SEC issued two proposals in 2003, which were enacted in 2004 as final rules. One (the "SIBHC Program") established rules under which a company that owned a broker-dealer, but not a bank, could register with the SEC as an investment bank holding company. The second (the "CSE Program") established a new alternative net capital computation method for a qualifying broker-dealer (a "CSE Broker") if its holding company (a "CSE Holding Company") elected to become a "Consolidated Supervised Entity." The SEC estimated it would cost each CSE Holding Company approximately $8 million per year to establish a European sub-holding company for its EU operations if "equivalent" consolidated supervision were not established in the United States.

Both the SIBHC and the CSE Programs laid out programs to monitor investment bank holding company market, credit, liquidity, operational and other "risks." The CSE Program had the added feature of permitting a CSE Broker to compute its net capital based on Basel Standards.

=== Delayed use of rule change by CSE Brokers ===
Ultimately, five investment bank holding companies (The Bear Stearns Companies Inc., The Goldman Sachs Group, Inc., Lehman Brothers Holdings Inc., Merrill Lynch & Co. Inc., and Morgan Stanley) entered the CSE Program. The SEC was thereby authorized to review the capital structure and risk management procedures of those holding companies. The holding companies were not eligible to enter the SIBHC Program because each owned a bank, although not the type of bank that would cause the holding company to be supervised by the Federal Reserve as a bank holding company. In addition two bank holding companies (Citigroup Inc. and JP Morgan Chase & Co.) entered the CSE Program.

A broker-dealer subsidiary of Merrill Lynch was the first to begin computing its net capital using the new method, beginning January 1, 2005. A Goldman Sachs broker-dealer subsidiary began using the new method after March 23, but before May 27, 2005. Broker-dealer subsidiaries of Bear Stearns, Lehman Brothers, and Morgan Stanley all began using the new method on December 1, 2005, the first day of the 2006 fiscal year for each of those CSE Holding Companies.

=== Possible effects of use of rule change ===
By permitting CSE Brokers to compute their net capital using Basel Standards, the SEC stated it had expected roughly a 40% reduction in the amount of "haircuts" imposed in computing a CSE Broker's "net capital" before giving effect to the $5 billion "tentative net capital" early warning requirement added in the final rule. The SEC also noted, however, it was unclear whether this would lead to any reduction in actual capital levels at broker-dealers, because broker-dealers typically maintain net capital in excess of required levels. In part this is because broker-dealers using the Alternative Method are required to report when net capital falls below 5% of "aggregate customer debit balances." At that level, a broker-dealer is prohibited from distributing excess capital to its owner. As a 1998 GAO Report noted, however, the excess net capital in large broker-dealers greatly exceeds even that "early warning" requirement and is best explained by the requirements imposed by counterparties in order to transact business with the broker-dealer. This had long been true for broker-dealers. A 1987 paper published by the Federal Reserve Bank of New York found that at year end 1986 sixteen diversified broker-dealers reported average net capital 7.3 times larger than required net capital ($408 million average reported level and $65 million average required level). The same paper stated "Market pressures, rather than regulations, determine how much excess net capital securities firms need to compete." Nevertheless, to protect against significant reductions in CSE Broker net capital, the SEC imposed the additional "early warning" requirement that required a CSE Broker to notify the SEC if its "tentative net capital" dropped below $5 billion.

Thus, the 2004 change to the Alternative Method raised the possibility increased net capital computations based on the same assets (and additional "less liquid" securities) would weaken customer protections in a CSE Broker liquidation. It also raised the possibility capital would be withdrawn from CSE Brokers and used in the non-broker/dealer business of CSE Holding Companies. It did not change the test against which net capital was measured. That test had never directly limited overall leverage of either a broker-dealer or its parent holding company.

== The collapses of Bear Stearns and Lehman Brothers ==
=== Bear Stearns ===
Bear Stearns was the first CSE Holding Company to collapse. It was "saved" through an "arranged" merger with JP Morgan Chase & Co. ("JP Morgan") announced on March 17, 2008, in connection with which the Federal Reserve Bank of New York ("FRBNY") made a $29 billion loan to a special purpose entity (Maiden Lane LLC) that took ownership of various assets of Bear Stearns with a quoted market value of $30 billion as of March 14, 2008.

The broker-dealer operations of Bear Stearns were absorbed by JP Morgan. The reported net capital position of the Bear Stearns CSE Broker (Bear Stearns & Co. Inc) was adequate and, it appears, would have been adequate under the pre-2004 "haircuts" as well.

=== Lehman Brothers ===
Lehman Brothers Holdings Inc entered bankruptcy on September 15, 2008. Its CSE Broker (Lehman Brothers Inc ("LBI")) was not included in the bankruptcy filing and continued to operate until its customer accounts and other assets were acquired by Barclays Capital Inc. As a condition to that acquisition the Securities Investor Protection Corporation ("SIPC") commenced a liquidation of LBI on September 19, 2008, in order to complete the transfer of LBI customer accounts and resolve disputes about the status of accounts.

Although there has been controversy about two overnight loans to LBI guaranteed by the FRBNY, it appears those loans funded intraday or overnight exposures of LBI to its customers in connection with settlements of customer transactions and that the collateral supporting those loans (i.e., customer settlement payments) repaid the loans on the day they were made or the following day. Reports indicate the "troubled assets" held by Lehman were commercial real estate assets.

== Capital withdrawals from CSE Brokers and leverage at CSE Holding Companies ==
While the CSE Brokers of Bear and Lehman may have remained solvent and liquid after the 2004 net capital rule change, it has been suggested the change had the effect of permitting a large expansion of the non-broker/dealer operations of Bear, Lehman, and the other CSE Holding Companies because they were able to extract excess net capital from their broker-dealers and use that capital to acquire dangerously large exposures to "risky assets."

=== Limited evidence of capital withdrawals from CSE Brokers ===
There does not appear to be any publicly available study comparing capital levels at CSE Brokers before and after they began using the net capital computation method permitted by the 2004 rule change. As described in Section 1.2 above, the SEC has stated "tentative net capital" levels at the CSE Brokers remained stable, or in some cases increased, after the 2004 rule change. CSE Brokers, however, could be permitted to include in net capital computations some "less liquid" securities that were excluded before the 2004 rule change.

The only CSE Holding Company that provided separate financial information for its CSE Broker, through consolidating financial statements, in its Form 10-K Report filings was Lehman Brothers Holdings Inc, because that CSE Broker (LBI) had sold subordinated debt in a public offering. Those filings show LBI's reported shareholders' equity increased after it became a CSE Broker. Goldman Sachs provides on its website an archive of the periodic Consolidated Statement of Financial Condition reports issued for its CSE Broker, Goldman Sachs & Co., which continued to operate as a limited partnership. Those statements show 2004 fiscal year-end GAAP total partners' capital of $4.211 billion, before Goldmans Sachs & Co. became a CSE Broker, growing to $6.248 billion by fiscal year-end 2007.

Merrill Lynch reported in its Form 10-K Report for 2005 that, in 2005, it made two withdrawals of capital from its CSE Broker in the total amount of $2.5 billion. In the same Form 10-K Report Merrill Lynch stated that the 2004 rule change was intended to "reduce regulatory capital costs" and that its CSE Broker subsidiary expected to make further reductions in its excess net capital. In that 2005 Form 10-K Report Merrill Lynch also reported that its consolidated year-end shareholders' equity for 2004 was $31.4 billion and for 2005 was $35.6 billion.

The other three CSE Brokers that reported net capital levels (i.e., Bear Stearns, Lehman Brothers, and Morgan Stanley) all reported significant increases in net capital in their CSE Holding Companies' Form 10-Q Reports for the first reporting period for which they used the new computation method (i.e., the first fiscal quarter of 2006), which would be consistent with reduced haircuts under that method. Bear Stearns and Lehman Brothers reported subsequent decreases that could be consistent with capital withdrawals. In earlier periods, however, broker-dealers that later became CSE Brokers also reported fluctuations in net capital levels with periods of significant decreases. None of these three CSE Holding Companies, nor Merrill Lynch after 2005, reported capital withdrawals from CSE Brokers in their Form 10-Q or 10-K Reports.

=== CSE Holding Company leverage increased after 2004, but was higher in 1990s ===
Studies of Form 10-K and Form 10-Q Report filings by CSE Holding Companies have shown their overall reported year-end leverage increased during the period from 2003 through 2007 and their overall reported fiscal quarter leverage increased from August 2006 through February 2008. Form 10-K Report filings for the same firms reporting fiscal year-end balance sheet information for the period from 1993 through 2002 show reported fiscal year-end leverage ratios in one or more years before 2000 for 4 of the 5 firms higher than their reported year-end leverage for any year from 2004 through 2007. Only Morgan Stanley had higher reported fiscal year-end leverage in 2007 than in any previous year since 1993. The year-end debt to equity ratios of 38.2 to 1 for Lehman in 1993, 34.2 to 1 for Merrill in 1997, and of 35 to 1 for Bear and 31.6 to 1 for Goldman in 1998 were all reached before the 2004 rule change. Even Morgan Stanley, which reported lower leverage after its 1997 merger with Dean Witter Reynolds, reported before the merger a 1996 fiscal year-end debt to equity leverage of 29.1 to 1.

The higher leverage reported by the four firms in the 1990s was not an anomaly of their reported year-end leverage ratios. Form 10-Q Reports filed by three of those four CSE Holding Companies show an even more marked difference between fiscal quarter end debt to equity ratios reported in the 1990s and the ratios reported after 2004. Each of the eight 10-Qs filed by Bear Stearns from its first fiscal quarter of 1997 through the second of 1999 show a debt to leverage ratio higher than the highest ratio (32.5 to 1) Bear reported in any Form 10-Q filed after 2004. Lehman Brothers reported a debt to equity ratio of 54.2 to 1 in its first Form 10-Q Report on the SEC's website (for the first fiscal quarter of 1994). All nine of Lehman's 10-Qs filed in 1997 through 1999 show higher debt to equity ratios than any of its 10-Qs filed after 2004. Merrill Lynch's highest reported debt to equity ratio in a Form 10-Q filed after 2004 is 27.5 to 1. All seven of Merrill's 10-Qs filed from the first fiscal quarter of 1997 through the first quarter of 1999 show a higher ratio. Because Goldman Sachs did not become a public company until 1999, it did not file Form 10-Q Reports during this period. The higher fiscal quarter spikes of investment bank leverage during the 1990s compared to after 2004 is graphically depicted in a 2008 NYFRB Staff Report.

The fact the investment banks that later became CSE Holding Companies had leverage levels well above 15 to 1 in the 1990s was noted before 2008. The President's Working Group on Financial Markets pointed out in its April 1999 report on hedge funds and the collapse of Long-Term Capital Management (LTCM) that those five largest investment banks averaged 27 to 1 leverage at year-end 1998 after absorbing the LTCM portfolio. At a more popular level, that finding was noted by Frank Partnoy in his 2004 book Infectious greed: how deceit and risk corrupted the financial markets. In 1999, the GAO provided leverage statistics for the four largest investment banks in its LTCM report showing Goldman Sachs and Merrill both exceeding the LTCM leverage ratio (at 34-to-1 and 30-to-1, respectively), Lehman equaling LTCM's 28-to-1 leverage, and Morgan Stanley trailing at 22-to-1. A 2009 GAO report repeated those findings and charted leverage from 1998 to 2007 for four of the CSE Holding Company to show three of those firms had higher leverage at the end of fiscal year 1998 than "at fiscal year-end 2006 before the crisis began."

== Net capital rule in financial crisis explanations since 2008 ==
Since 2008, the conclusion that the 2004 rule change permitted dramatically increased leverage at CSE Holding Companies has become firmly embedded in the vast literature commenting on the 2008 financial crisis and in testimony before Congress. In This Time is Different Professors Carmen M. Reinhart and Kenneth S. Rogoff characterize the 2004 rule change as the SEC's decision "to allow investment banks to triple their leverage ratios." In Too Big to Save Robert Pozen writes "the fundamental problem" for the CSE Holding Companies "resulted primarily from the SEC's decision to permit them to more than double their leverage ratio, combined with the SEC's ineffective efforts to implement the consolidated supervision" of the CSE Holding Companies. Jane D'Arista testified to the House Financial Services Committee in October, 2009, that the 2004 rule change constituted a "relaxation of the leverage limit for investment banks from $12 to $30 per $1 of capital." The issue entered military theory when Gautam Mukunda and Major General William J. Troy wrote, in the US Army War College Quarterly, that the 2004 rule change allowed investment banks "to increase their leverage to as high as 40 to 1" when previously "the SEC had limited investment banks to a leverage ratio of 12 to 1."

In reviewing similar statements made by former SEC chief economist Susan Woodward and, as cited in Section 1.1, Professors Alan Blinder, John Coffee, and Joseph Stiglitz, Professor Andrew Lo and Mark Mueller note 1999 and 2009 GAO reports documented investment bank leverage ratios had been higher before 2000 than after the 2004 rule change and that "these leverage numbers were in the public domain and easily available through company annual reports and quarterly SEC filings." Lo and Mueller cite this as an example of how "sophisticated and informed individuals can be so easily misled on a relatively simple and empirically verifiable issue", which "underscores the need for careful deliberation and analysis, particularly during periods of extreme distress when the sense of urgency may cause us to draw inferences too quickly and inaccurately." They describe how mental errors that contributed to the financial crisis and that now contribute to mistaken understandings of that crisis flow from "mental models of reality that are not complete or entirely accurate" but that lead us to accept, without critical review, information that "confirms our preconceptions."

Lo and Mueller note the New York Times has not corrected the 2008 NY Times Article. At least two of the scholars mentioned in Section 1.2 have (by implication) corrected their 2008 statements that before 2004 investment bank leverage was limited to 12 to 1. In the July–August 2009 issue of the Harvard Business Review, Niall Ferguson noted information that from 1993 to 2002 Bear Stearns, Goldman Sachs, Merrill Lynch, and Morgan Stanley reported average leverage ratios of 26 to 1 (with Bear Stearns having an average ratio of 32 to 1 during those years). In his 2010 book, Freefall, Joseph Stiglitz noted that in 2002 leverage at the large investment banks was as high as 29 to 1. He also directed readers to the 2009 Sirri Speech and the 2008 NY Sun Article for different views on the role of the 2004 rule change in investment bank difficulties.

== Net capital rule in Financial Crisis Inquiry Commission report ==
The Financial Inquiry Crisis Report ("FCIC Report") issued by the FCIC on January 27, 2011, presented the FCIC majority's view of the effect of the 2004 net capital rule change on leverage by stating: "Leverage at the investment banks increased from 2004 to 2007, growth that some critics have blamed on the SEC's change in the net capital rules...In fact, leverage had been higher at the five investment banks in the late 1990s, then dropped before increasing over the life of the CSE program—a history that suggests that the program was not solely responsible for the changes."

Thus, while the FCIC Report identified leverage, especially leverage at investment banks, as an important feature of the financial crisis, it did not identify the 2004 net capital rule change as creating or permitting that leverage. The FCIC Report also noted the 18-month delay before all the CSE Holding Companies qualified for the CSE Program. While the FCIC Report did not draw any conclusion from this delay beyond including it in a general critique of the SEC's execution of the CSE Program, as described in Section 5.2 above the delay eliminates the 2004 rule change from playing a role in any increase in CSE Holding Company leverage in 2004. Because they all only entered the CSE Program at the beginning of their 2006 fiscal years, the delay eliminates the 2004 rule change from playing a role in any 2005 leverage increases reported by Bear Stearns, Lehman Brothers, or Morgan Stanley.

The FCIC Report was highly critical of the SEC's implementation of the CSE Program, rejected former SEC Chairman Christopher Cox's assertion that the program was "fatally flawed" by being voluntary, and specifically concluded that the SEC failed to exercise the powers it had under the CSE Program to restrict the "risky activities" of CSE Holding Companies and to "require them to hold adequate capital and liquidity for their activities." The SEC did not have those powers before 2004 and only gained them through the CSE Program.

The persistent confusion about the application of the net capital rule to CSE Holding Companies, however, resurfaced in the FCIC Report. After explaining the net capital rule applied to broker-dealers, not their parent holding companies, the FCIC Report misquoted the 2009 Sirri Speech as stating "investment bank net capital was stable, or in some cases increased, after the rule change." As a more serious indication of continuing misunderstanding of the 2004 rule change, on the day the FCIC issued its report (January 27, 2011) economist Robert Hall addressed an MIT symposium on economics and finance. In describing the background to the financial crisis he stated: "I think that the one most important failure of regulation is easy to identify. In 2004 the SEC removed its capital requirements on investment banks... So the reason that Lehman was able to do what it did, which proved so destructive, was that it had no limits on the amount of leverage it could adopt."

== See also ==
- 2008 financial crisis
- Christopher Cox
- Financial regulation
- Harvey Goldschmid
- Paul S. Atkins
- Securities regulation in the United States
- U.S. Securities and Exchange Commission
- William H. Donaldson
