= Stochastic volatility jump models =

Class of financial models with stochastic volatility and jumps

Stochastic Volatility Jump Models (SVJ models) are a class of mathematical models in quantitative finance that combine stochastic volatility dynamics with discontinuous jumps in asset prices. These models aim to more accurately reflect the empirical characteristics of financial markets, particularly those that deviate from the assumptions of classical models such as the Black–Scholes model.

SVJ models are capable of capturing stylized facts commonly observed in asset returns, including heavy tails (leptokurtosis), skewness, abrupt price changes, and the persistence of volatility clustering. These models also provide a more realistic explanation for implied volatility surfaces, such as volatility smiles and skews, which are inadequately modeled by constant-volatility frameworks.

By introducing both a stochastic variance process and a jump component—typically modeled via a Poisson process or more general Lévy processes—SVJ models allow for more flexible and accurate pricing of financial derivatives, especially options and volatility-linked instruments.

== Overview ==
Stochastic volatility jump models extend both pure stochastic volatility models, such as the Heston model, and jump diffusion models, such as the Merton model, by integrating the two components into a unified framework. In these models, the asset price is driven by a continuous-time stochastic variance process and is also subject to discontinuous jumps, typically modeled using a Poisson process or more general Lévy processes.

This dual structure enables SVJ models to account for both persistent volatility fluctuations and sudden, unexpected market movements. The stochastic component captures long-term variability and volatility clustering, while the jump component reflects abrupt price changes due to market events, earnings surprises, or systemic shocks.

== Fundamental hypotheses ==
Stochastic volatility jump models rely on several core assumptions that extend the classical framework of Itô diffusion models to accommodate more complex market behavior. These include:

- The asset price process follows a continuous-time stochastic differential equation (SDE) with both diffusion and jump components, defined under a risk-neutral measure for pricing purposes.
- Volatility is stochastic and mean-reverting, typically modeled as a Cox–Ingersoll–Ross process or other Markovian dynamics, allowing for volatility clustering and persistent uncertainty.
- Price jumps arrive according to a Poisson process (or compound Lévy process), with jump sizes modeled by a separate distribution such as log-normal or exponential, introducing discontinuities in asset paths.
- The market is assumed to be arbitrage-free and often informationally efficient, although the presence of jumps introduces market incompleteness, making perfect hedging impossible with standard instruments.

== Mathematical formulation ==
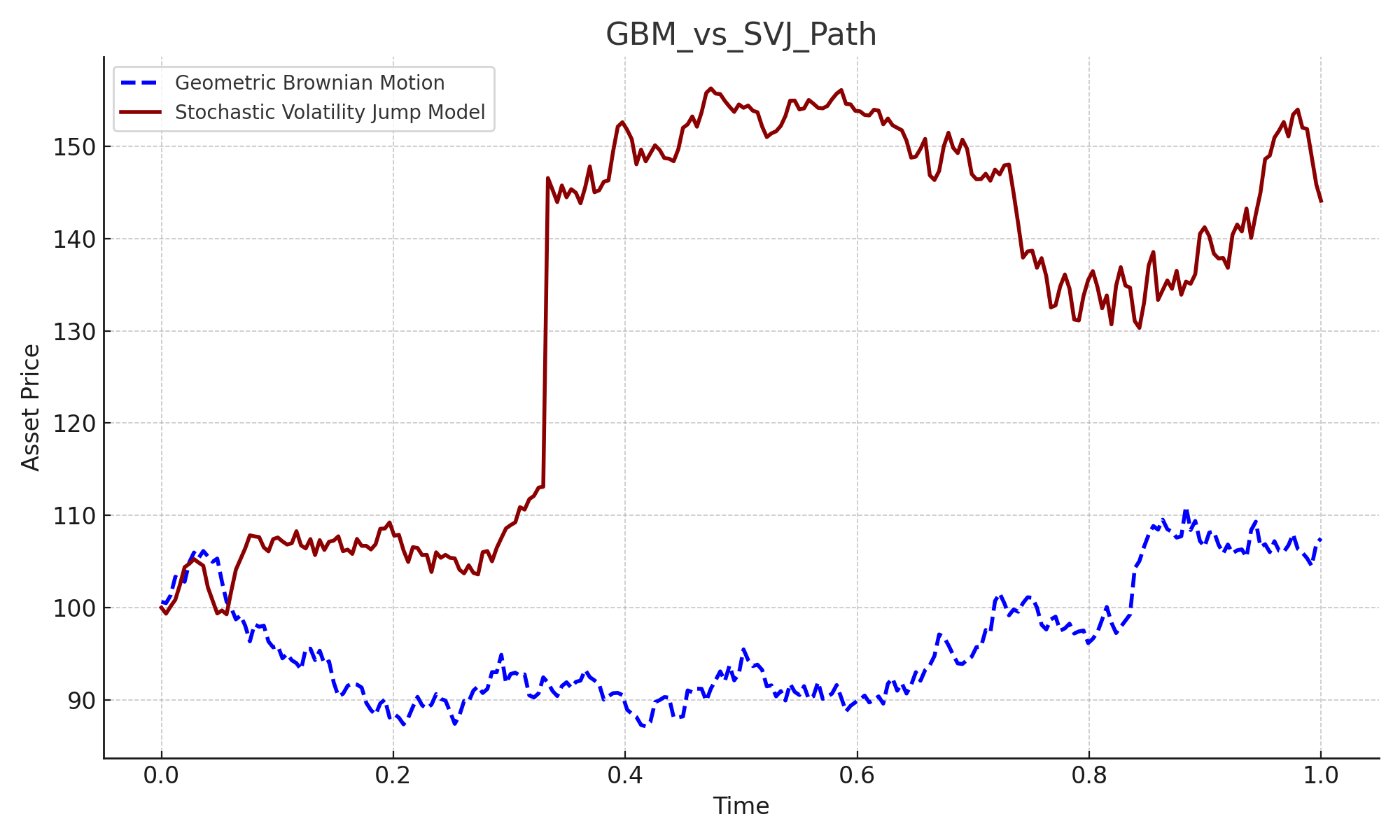
Comparison of GBM and SVJ paths, showing volatility clustering and price jumps.

A typical stochastic volatility jump (SVJ) model assumes that the asset price $S_t$ evolves under a risk-neutral measure $\mathbb{Q}$ according to the following system of stochastic differential equations (SDEs):

$$\begin{aligned}
dS_t &= \mu S_t\,dt + \sqrt{v_t}\,S_t\,dW_t^S + (J_t - 1)\,S_{t-}\,dN_t, \\
dv_t &= \kappa(\theta - v_t)\,dt + \sigma_v \sqrt{v_t}\,dW_t^v
\end{aligned}$$

where:

- $v_t$ is the instantaneous variance of the asset, typically modeled as a Cox–Ingersoll–Ross process to ensure positivity;
- $W_t^S$ and $W_t^v$ are correlated standard Brownian motions with correlation coefficient $\rho$;
- $N_t$ is a Poisson process with intensity $\lambda$, representing jump arrival times;
- $J_t$ is a random multiplicative jump size, often modeled as log-normally distributed: $\log J_t \sim \mathcal{N}(\mu_J, \sigma_J^2)$.

Alternatively, in some credit risk and asymmetric modeling frameworks, the jump size is modeled as exponentially distributed: $\Delta \log S_t \sim \text{Exp}(\eta)$, where $\eta > 0$ is the rate parameter.

The stochastic variance $v_t$ captures volatility clustering and long-term uncertainty, while the jump component introduces discontinuous movements in prices, enhancing the model's ability to replicate empirical asset return distributions.

The inclusion of correlation $\rho$ between the asset return and its variance introduces the so-called leverage effect, a common feature in equity markets.

== Notable models ==
Several variants of stochastic volatility jump models have been developed to capture different market phenomena and to allow for greater flexibility in pricing derivatives.

=== Bates model ===
The Bates model combines the Heston model for stochastic volatility with Merton-style jumps in asset prices. It preserves the mean-reverting variance process of the Heston model while adding a Poisson-driven jump component:

$$\begin{aligned}
dS_t &= \mu S_t\,dt + \sqrt{v_t} S_t\,dW_t^S + (J_t - 1) S_{t-}\,dN_t, \\
dv_t &= \kappa(\theta - v_t)\,dt + \sigma_v \sqrt{v_t}\,dW_t^v
\end{aligned}$$

where $J_t$ is the jump multiplier and $N_t$ is a Poisson process.

=== SVJJ model ===
The SVJJ model generalizes the Bates framework by allowing for jumps in both the asset price and the variance process:

$$\begin{aligned}
dS_t &= \mu S_t\,dt + \sqrt{v_t} S_t\,dW_t^S + (J_t^S - 1) S_{t-}\,dN_t^S, \\
dv_t &= \kappa(\theta - v_t)\,dt + \sigma_v \sqrt{v_t}\,dW_t^v + J_t^v\,dN_t^v
\end{aligned}$$

Here, $J_t^S$ and $J_t^v$ are jump sizes in return and variance, with separate Poisson processes $N_t^S$ and $N_t^v$.

=== Duffie–Pan–Singleton (DPS) model ===
The DPS model adopts an affine process formulation, where the joint process of returns and volatility evolves under a state-space representation:

$dX_t = K(\Theta - X_t)\,dt + \Sigma \sqrt{X_t}\,dW_t + dJ_t$

Here, $X_t$ is a vector of state variables (e.g., log-price and variance), and $J_t$ is a multivariate jump process. The model is designed to preserve analytical tractability.

=== Barndorff-Nielsen–Shephard (BNS) model ===
The BNS model introduces a non-Gaussian Ornstein–Uhlenbeck process for stochastic variance driven by a Lévy subordinator:

$dv_t = -\lambda v_t\,dt + dZ_t$

The return process is then modeled as:

$dS_t = \mu\,dt + \sqrt{v_t}\,dW_t$

where $Z_t$ is a non-decreasing Lévy process (e.g., Gamma process) and $v_t$ captures jumps in volatility without requiring jumps in price.

== Applications ==
Stochastic volatility jump (SVJ) models are widely used in financial engineering and quantitative risk management due to their ability to replicate observed features in market data that cannot be captured by simpler models.

One of the primary applications is in the pricing and hedging of financial derivatives, particularly options. SVJ models are able to generate more realistic implied volatility surfaces, capturing both the volatility smile and skew commonly observed in equity and foreign exchange markets.

SVJ models also play a key role in volatility forecasting, as they provide a dynamic framework that accounts for both persistent volatility clustering and sudden shifts due to market events. These features are essential for accurate computation of value at risk (VaR), expected shortfall, and other risk metrics used by financial institutions.

In addition, SVJ frameworks are applied in the modeling of credit risk, where asset values are subject to abrupt changes, and in interest rate modeling where jumps may capture macroeconomic shocks or policy announcements.

The flexibility of SVJ models also makes them useful in model calibration, particularly when fitting option prices across multiple strikes and maturities. Techniques such as the Fourier transform, characteristic function methods (e.g., Carr–Madan), and Markov Chain Monte Carlo (MCMC) are often used to estimate model parameters efficiently.

=== Option pricing ===
SVJ models are particularly useful for pricing European and American options in markets where volatility is not constant and sudden price changes occur. The presence of jumps and stochastic variance allows the model to produce implied volatility surfaces that better match observed market data—especially the volatility smile and skew patterns.

Option prices under SVJ models are often computed using Fourier transform techniques, leveraging the characteristic function of the log-price process. Methods such as the Carr–Madan formula and the COS method are commonly employed for computational efficiency.

For American-style or path-dependent options, numerical methods such as finite difference schemes, Monte Carlo simulation with jump adjustments, or regression-based Longstaff–Schwartz methods are often used.

Overall, SVJ models improve pricing accuracy, especially for short-dated and out-of-the-money options, where the impact of jumps is more pronounced.

== Advantages and limitations ==
Stochastic volatility jump (SVJ) models offer several advantages over traditional models such as the Black–Scholes model and the Heston model without jumps.

One major advantage is their ability to jointly capture leptokurtosis (fat tails), skewness, and sudden large movements in asset prices, all of which are empirically observed in financial markets. SVJ models also allow for improved calibration to market option prices, enabling more accurate pricing and hedging of exotic derivatives.

However, these models come with certain limitations. The inclusion of both stochastic volatility and jump components increases model complexity and can lead to overfitting if not properly constrained. Parameter estimation can be computationally intensive and may require advanced numerical techniques such as maximum likelihood estimation, Kalman filtering, or Bayesian inference.

Another challenge lies in the identification of jump components in high-frequency data, as distinguishing between sudden changes due to jumps and those from high volatility alone can be statistically ambiguous.

Despite these drawbacks, SVJ models remain an important part of the quantitative finance toolkit, especially in applications where market realism and tail-risk modeling are critical.

== Variants and extensions ==
Several extensions of the basic stochastic volatility jump (SVJ) framework have been proposed to better capture empirical phenomena or improve tractability in pricing and calibration.

=== Bates model ===
The Bates model extends the Heston model by incorporating jumps in the asset price. It is widely used in option pricing due to its semi-closed-form solution via Fourier inversion.

The model dynamics under the risk-neutral measure $\mathbb{Q}$ are given by:
$$\begin{aligned}
dS_t &= \mu S_t\,dt + \sqrt{v_t} S_t\,dW_t^S + (J_t - 1) S_{t-}\,dN_t, \\
dv_t &= \kappa(\theta - v_t)\,dt + \sigma_v \sqrt{v_t}\,dW_t^v
\end{aligned}$$

=== SVJJ model (stochastic volatility with jumps in volatility and price) ===
The SVJJ model introduces jumps not only in the asset price but also in the volatility process: $dv_t = \kappa(\theta - v_t)\,dt + \sigma_v \sqrt{v_t}\,dW_t^v + \eta_v\,dN_t^v,$ where $dN_t^v$ is a Poisson process driving jumps in volatility. This provides more flexibility in capturing volatility bursts and market turmoil events.

=== BNS model (Barndorff-Nielsen–Shephard) ===
The Barndorff-Nielsen–Shephard model is a non-Gaussian SVJ model where the volatility follows an Ornstein–Uhlenbeck-type process driven by a Lévy subordinator. It enables a purely jump-driven volatility process and is used in high-frequency volatility estimation.

== Calibration techniques ==
Calibrating stochastic volatility jump (SVJ) models involves estimating both continuous diffusion parameters and jump-related components from market data. This process is crucial for ensuring the model fits observed option prices or high-frequency asset paths.

One common approach is to calibrate SVJ models to implied volatility surfaces by minimizing the pricing error across a range of strikes and maturities. Techniques such as least-squares minimization or maximum likelihood estimation are often used. The model's characteristic function enables efficient option pricing via Fourier inversion methods such as the Carr–Madan formula.

Alternatively, when working with time-series data (e.g., asset returns), likelihood-based estimation or the Kalman filter and its nonlinear extensions (e.g., particle filters) may be employed to estimate hidden volatility states and jump intensities.

In Bayesian frameworks, Markov chain Monte Carlo (MCMC) methods are used to infer the posterior distributions of model parameters, especially useful when models are highly nonlinear or contain latent processes.

The choice of calibration method depends on the application: derivative pricing typically uses cross-sectional calibration to option prices, while risk management and volatility forecasting often rely on historical time series and filtering techniques.
