= Lan Zhang =

Chinese-American financial econometrician

Lan Zhang is a Chinese-American scholar of financial econometrics specializing in market microstructure and high frequency data. She is a professor of finance at the University of Illinois Chicago.

== Education and career ==
Zhang studied psychology at Peking University, graduating in 1992. After earning a master's degree in psychology at the University of Chicago in 1995, she switched to statistics, completing her Ph.D. in Chicago in 2001. While a doctoral student, she also spent a year as an exchange scholar at the Bendheim Center for Finance at Princeton University. Her doctoral dissertation, From Martingales to ANOVA: Implied and Realized Volatility, was supervised by Per Aslak Mykland.

She joined Carnegie Mellon University (CMU) as an assistant professor of statistics, affiliated with the Center for Computational Finance, in 2001. She was tenured there as an associate professor, effective 2006, but by 2005 had already left CMU to take an assistant professorship at the University of Illinois Chicago. She was tenured again at the University of Illinois in 2008, and from 2009 to 2010 took a leave to become a reader at the University of Oxford in the Saïd Business School and Oxford-Man Institute of Quantitative Finance, and a Fellow of St Edmund Hall, Oxford. Returning to the University of Illinois at Chicago, she was promoted to full professor in 2010.

== Recognition ==
Zhang was elected as a fellow of the Society for Financial Econometrics in 2016. She was named to the 2022 class of Fellows of the Institute of Mathematical Statistics, for "leadership in developing statistical concepts and methods for high-frequency data, and for conscientious mentoring and professional service".
