= Nikolaus Hautsch =

German economist and statistician

- Citizenship: German
- Known for: Financial econometrics
- Scientific career
- Fields: Economics
- Workplaces: University of Vienna

Nikolaus Hautsch (born 1972) is a German economist and statistician. Since 2013, he has been professor of finance and statistics at the University of Vienna and since 2023, he has been serving as vice rector for infrastructure at the University of Vienna. He is known for his work in financial econometrics, the statistical analysis of financial high frequency data and market microstructure analysis.

== Biography ==
Hautsch was born on March 9, 1972, in Singen (Germany) and grew up in Radolfzell.

He graduated with a diploma in economics from the University of Konstanz in 1998. He earned his PhD in econometrics in 2003 from the University of Konstanz.

From 2004 to 2007, he was assistant professor and associate professor at the University of Copenhagen's Department of Economics. From 2007 to 2013 he held the Chair of Econometrics at Humboldt University of Berlin. In 2013, he joined the University of Vienna as professor of finance and statistics.

Hautsch had visiting positions at the University of Technology Sydney, the University of Melbourne, the Université catholique de Louvain, the University of Cambridge and Duke University, among others.

He is elected fellow of the Society for Financial Econometrics, research fellow of the Center for Financial Studies (CFS), Frankfurt, faculty member of the Vienna Graduate School of Finance, and member of the research platform "Data Science" at the University of Vienna.
