= Henry Neave =

British academic and educator

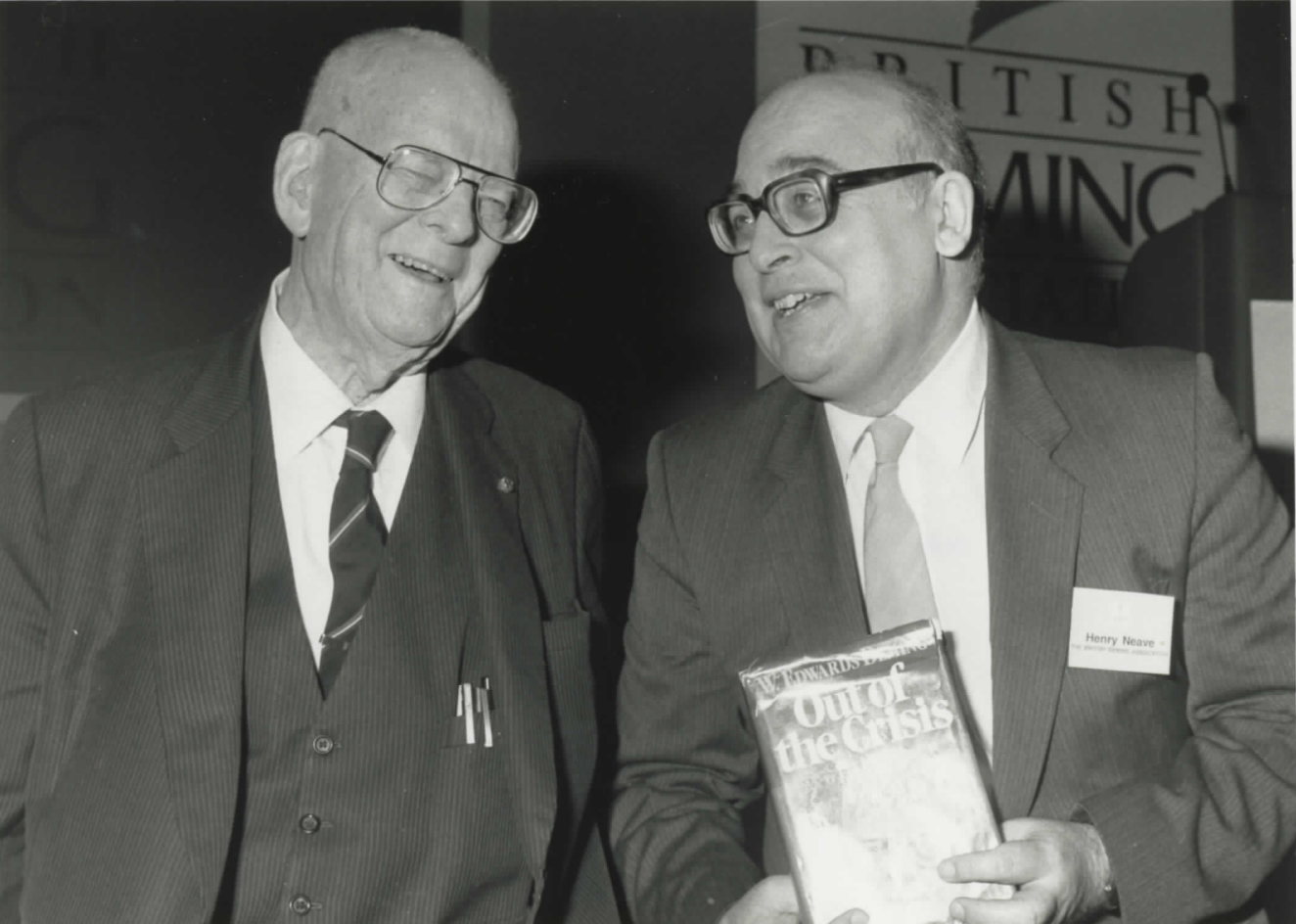
- Henry Neave (right) with W Edwards Deming
- Born: Henry Robert Neave; July 14, 1942 (age 84)
- Education: University of Nottingham (BSc); University of Nottingham (PhD)
- Known for: PDSA, total quality management, quality control
- Scientific career
- Fields: Business administration and theory, economics, statistics

Henry Neave is a British business theorist, management consultant, statistician, and writer. He is one of the leading proponents of the philosophy of W. Edwards Deming, with whom he was a close friend and colleague.

Neave received his doctorate from The University of Nottingham, and was supervised by Sir Clive Granger. He lectured at his alma mater from 1963 until 1996, and later served as the W. Edwards Deming Professor of Leadership and Management in the Business School of Nottingham Trent University until his retirement at the end of 2004.

In 1985 Deming requested Neave to assist him at his four-day seminar in London, his first in Britain. Neave would go on to assist Deming at these seminars in each subsequent year until Deming's death in 1993.

In 1987 Neave founded the British Deming Association, and three years later his book The Deming Dimension was first published, regarded as a clear discussion to the Deming philosophy and to which Deming himself wrote the foreword. Predating Deming's final work, The New Economics for Industry, Government, Education, it is the first published work to reference Deming's System of Profound Knowledge.

In 2001, Neave received the American Society for Quality's Deming Medal. This was awarded "For his dedication to a new philosophy and long-term commitment to transformation through teaching and helping organizations apply the Deming principles of management."

After Neave retired, demand for his training and consulting services continued, due to his ability to explain Deming’s works and enable people to understand how to use this knowledge. To meet this need Neave developed the 12 days to Deming active learning course. Neave made this course completely free and has been used by thousands of students across the world; the materials have created communities of students learning Deming including in Australia, India and Mexico.

== Works ==
- Neave, Henry R. (1988). Distribution free tests. Unwin Hyman. ISBN 0318410958.
- Neave, Henry R. (1996). "'I shall teach...the theory of a system, and cooperation'". Training for Quality. 4 (4). MCB UP Ltd: 25–31. doi:10.1108/09684879610149017.
- Neave, Henry R. (2011) [1998]. Elementary Statistics Tables. Routledge. ISBN 9780415563475.
- Neave, Henry R. (1990) [1998]. The Deming Dimension. SPC Press. ISBN 978-0-945320-36-4.
