= Heather M. Anderson =

Australian economist

Heather Margot Anderson (born 1956) is an Australian economist, the Maureen Brunt Professor of Economics and Econometrics, emerita, at the Monash University Business School. Her research has concerned applied econometrics, macro-economics, the economic analysis of climate change, and financial econometrics.

== Education and career ==
Anderson was born in 1956 in Adelaide. She has a 1977 bachelor's degree in mathematics from the University of New England (Australia). Following this, she worked as a government statistician from 1977 to 1983, for the Cook Islands (through Australian Volunteers Abroad), the New South Wales State Treasury, and for the New Zealand Department of Statistics.

She returned to graduate study in economics at the Australian National University, receiving a graduate diploma in 1987. She went on for a master's degree and Ph.D. in economics from the University of California, San Diego. Her 1992 doctoral dissertation, Nonlinearities and shifts in macroeconomic regimes, was supervised by Clive Granger.

She was an assistant professor of economics at the University of Texas at Austin from 1992 to 1995 and at Texas A&M University from 1995 to 1998. Returning to Australia, she became a senior lecturer and associate professor at Monash University from 1999 to 2003. In 2004 she became professor of econometrics at the Australian National University; there, she was co-director for Macro-econometric Models and Methods in the Centre for Applied Macroeconomic Analysis from 2005 until 2012. She returned to Monash as professor in the Department of Econometrics and Business Statistics in 2010, and served as head of the department from 2016 until 2018.

== Recognition ==
Anderson was elected as a Fellow of the Academy of the Social Sciences in Australia in 2005, as a Fellow of the International Association for Applied Econometrics in 2018, and as a Fellow of the Econometric Society in 2025. Monash University held a workshop in honour of her and Farshid Vahid's retirements in March 2025.
