= Kim Lee =

Kim Lee may refer to:

- Kim Lee-sub (1974–), South Korean football player
- Lee Kim Sai (1938–2019), Malaysian politician
- Kim Lee, nom de plume of Steven L. Heston, American mathematician, economist, financier and gambling researcher
- Lee Kim Lai (1960–1978), Singapore police officer who was abducted and murdered
- Lee Ann Kim, Korean American anchor for the San Diego, California, ABC television affiliate; activist for the Asian American community
- Kim Lee (drag queen) (1963–2020), Polish drag queen

== See also ==
- Lee (Korean name)
- Li (surname)
