= Edith Eger =

American clinical psychologist (1927–2026)

- Edith Eva Éger
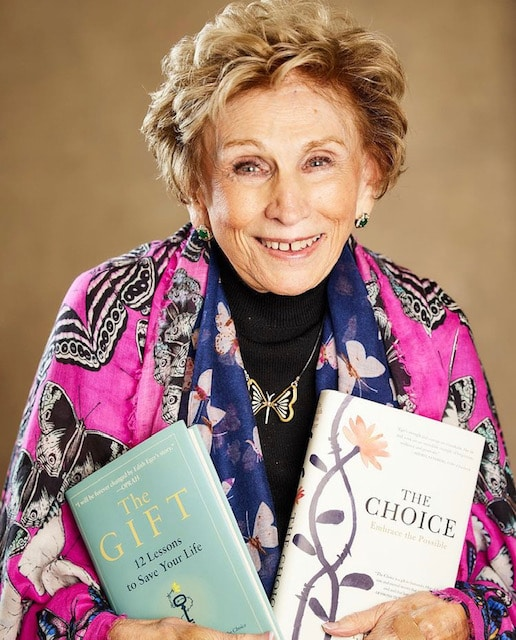
- Eger in 2023
- Born: Edith Eva Elefánt; September 29, 1927; Košice, Czechoslovakia
- Died: April 27, 2026 (aged 98); San Diego, California, U.S.
- Education: University of Texas at El Paso (Ph.D.)
- Occupation: Clinical psychologist
- Spouse: Béla (Albert) Éger (m. 1945; died 1993)
- Relatives: Robert F. Engle (son-in-law)
- Writing career
- Genres: Memoir, self-help
- Subjects: Holocaust survivor experiences, recovery from trauma
- Notable works: The Choice: Embrace the Possible (2017); The Gift: 12 Lessons to Save Your Life (2020)
- Scientific career
- Thesis: Effects of Concentration Camp Stress upon the Development of Life Attitudes in Jewish Subjects (1974)

Edith Eva Eger (née Elefánt, September 29, 1927 – April 27, 2026) was a Hungarian and American psychologist, specialist in the treatment of post-traumatic stress disorder, and Holocaust survivor. Her memoir entitled The Choice: Embrace the Possible, published in 2017, became an international bestseller. Her second book, titled The Gift: 12 Lessons to Save Your Life was published in September 2020.

== Background ==
Edith Eva Elefánt was born on September 29, 1927, in Košice, Czechoslovakia (present-day Slovakia), as the youngest daughter of Leopold (Lajos) Elefánt (1892–1944) (a tailor) and Helena (Ilona) Klein (1895–1944).

Eger attended gymnasium and took ballet lessons. She was a member of the Hungarian Olympic gymnastics team. In 1942 the Hungarian government enacted new anti-Jewish laws and she was removed from the gymnastics team. Her elder sister Klara was a violin player and was admitted to the Conservatory of Budapest. During the war Klara was hidden by her music teacher. Her sister Magda was a pianist.

In March 1944, after the German occupation of Hungary, Eger was forced to live in the Kassa (Košice) ghetto with her parents and Magda. In April, they were forced to stay in a brick factory with 12,000 other Jews for a month. In May of that year they were deported to Auschwitz. She was separated from her mother by Josef Mengele; her mother was murdered in the gas chamber. In her memoirs, Eger relates that the same evening Mengele made her dance for him in her barracks. As a "thank you", she received a loaf of bread that she shared with other girls.

According to her memoirs, Eger stayed in various camps, including Mauthausen. The Nazis evacuated Mauthausen and other concentration camps as the Americans and the Red Army approached. Eger was sent on a death march with her sister Magda to the Gunskirchen concentration camp, a distance of about 55 kilometres (34 mi). When she was unable to walk further due to exhaustion, one of the girls with whom she had shared Mengele's bread recognized her and carried her onward together with Magda. Conditions in Gunskirchen were so bad that Eger had to eat grass to survive, while other prisoners turned to cannibalism. When the U.S. military liberated the camp in May 1945, according to Eger, she was left for dead among a number of dead bodies. A soldier is said to have rescued her after seeing her hand move. The soldier quickly sought medical attention and saved her life. She weighed 32 kilograms (5.0 st; 71 lb) at the time, and had a broken back, typhoid fever, pneumonia, and pleurisy.

While in the camps Eger guided those close to her to look at life from the inside out, as in to be reflective of their inner world. Her belief is to never wait for someone to make you happy, but to go within and seek happiness within oneself, as this will then alter the way the world around you is perceived. To be realistic and not idealistic, is also one of Eger's practices. Her deep faith in the camps encouraged her to pray for the guards that kept her in the camps, understanding that they were brainwashed. In her words: "People said where was God but I always say that God was with me", she says. "The Nazi guards were prisoners too. I prayed for them. I turned hatred into pity. I never told anyone that they were spending their days murdering people. What kind of life was that for them? They had been brainwashed. Their own youth had been taken away from them."

== After the war ==
Edith and Magda recovered in American field hospitals and returned to Kassa where they found their sister Klara. Their parents and Edith's fiancé Eric did not survive Auschwitz. When she was 19, she met and subsequently married Bela (Albert) Eger who had survived the war as a Jewish resistance fighter in the Slovak region. Their plan to settle in Czechoslovakia failed when Béla, whose wealthy family owned a food business, was jailed by the communists. Edith secured his freedom by bribing a guard with a diamond ring. The couple briefly considered moving to Israel, but fearing more violence, they emigrated to the United States with their daughter Marianne and settled in Baltimore. Not being able to speak English, while living in Baltimore Eger could only find work in an underwear factory. Seeking greater opportunity, the family moved to Texas where Bela found employment as an accountant. While Eger suffered from her war trauma and survivor guilt she did not talk about the war with her three children.

Eger befriended Viktor Frankl, went into therapy, and received her PhD in clinical psychology from the University of Texas at El Paso in 1978. Her thesis was "Effects of Concentration Camp Stress upon the Development of Life Attitudes in Jewish Subjects". She also received her license to practice as a psychologist. She opened a therapy clinic in La Jolla, California, and was appointed to the faculty at the University of California, San Diego.

In 1990, Eger returned to Auschwitz to face her repressed emotions. At the urging of Philip Zimbardo, she published her experiences in her first book The Choice in 2017.

In her work as a psychologist, Eger helped her clients to free themselves from their own thoughts, and helped them to ultimately choose freedom. The Choice became a New York Times and Sunday Times bestseller. In her second book The Gift (2020) she encourages the reader to change the thoughts that, according to Eger, "imprison us and the destructive behaviors that would hinder us. What happens to us in life is not the most important thing in the end. ... Rather, the most important thing is what we do with our lives."

Eger appeared on CNN and The Oprah Winfrey Show.

== Personal life and death ==
Eger died in San Diego on April 27, 2026, at the age of 98. Bela Eger preceded her in death in 1993.

At the time of her death, Edith Eger was survived by her daughter Marianne Engle, a clinical psychologist married to Robert Engle, Nobel laureate in economics; Audrey Thompson, an executive coach; son John, a retired businessman; five grandchildren and ten great grandchildren.

== Books ==
- The Choice: Embrace the Possible. Scribner, 2017, ISBN 978-1-5011-3078-6.
- The Gift: 12 Lessons to Save Your Life. Ebury Publishing, 2020, ISBN 978-1-84604-627-8. A later edition is entitled The Gift: 14 Lessons to Save Your Life.
- The Ballerina of Auschwitz. Rider & Co., 2024, ISBN 978-1-84604-781-7.
