= Harry Pitt =

British mathematician

- Born: 3 June 1914; West Bromwich, England
- Died: 8 October 2005 (aged 91); Brailsford, Derbyshire, England, United Kingdom
- Citizenship: United Kingdom
- Education: University of Cambridge
- Scientific career
- Fields: Mathematics
- Workplaces: University of Nottingham
- Doctoral advisors: G. H. Hardy; David Widder
- Doctoral students: Clive Granger

Sir Harry Raymond Pitt FRS (3 June 1914 – 8 October 2005) was a British mathematician.

== Life and career ==
Harry Raymond Pitt was born in West Bromwich in 1914, the son of Harry and Harriet Pitt. He attended King Edward's School, Stourbridge, before going up to Peterhouse, Cambridge.

From 1936 to 1939 he held a Fellowship at Peterhouse, during which period he spent about a year at Harvard as a Choate Memorial Fellow. He was awarded a PhD by Cambridge University in 1938 for research on Tauberian theorems, giving him a long-term interest in probability theory.

In 1942 Pitt went to work in London at the Air Ministry and the Ministry of Aircraft Production.

In 1945 Harry Pitt was appointed Professor of Mathematics at Queen's University of Belfast. In 1950 he moved to the University of Nottingham as Professor of Pure Mathematics. In 1962–63 he once more crossed the Atlantic to serve as a visiting professor at Yale University.

In 1964 Pitt was appointed Vice-Chancellor of the University of Reading, in which post he remained until 1978.

Pitt was at Reading University during the student rebellion of 1968. In one well-publicised incident, he and the registrar were taken hostage by students and locked in a building on the campus. But he had anticipated this possibility and was able to escape using a spare set of keys.

Between 1975 and 1978 Pitt served as chairman of the Universities Central Council on Admissions, and between 1984 and 1985 he was President of the Institute of Mathematics and its Applications, the association of practising mathematicians.

Pitt was awarded honorary degrees by the universities of Aberdeen (1970), Nottingham (1970), Reading (1978), and Belfast (1981). He was elected Fellow of the Royal Society in 1957 and was knighted in 1978.
