= Mark Watson (economist) =

American economist and academic

- Born: 1952 (age 73–74)

Academic background
- Education: Pierce College; California State University, Northridge; University of California, San Diego
- Doctoral advisor: Robert F. Engle
- Influences: Clive Granger

Academic work
- Discipline: Econometrics
- Institutions: Princeton University
- Website: Information at IDEAS / RePEc

Mark W. Watson (born 1952) is the Howard Harrison and Gabrielle Snyder Beck Professor of Economics and Public Affairs at the Woodrow Wilson School of Public and International Affairs at Princeton University. Prior to coming to Princeton in 1995, Watson served on the economics faculty at Harvard University and Northwestern University. His research focuses on time-series econometrics, empirical macroeconomics, and macroeconomic forecasting.

Watson has published widely cited articles in these areas, and is the co-author of Introduction to Econometrics, a leading undergraduate textbook.

He received a B.A. in economics at California State University, Northridge and a Ph.D. in economics at the University of California, San Diego.

He and Tim Bollerslev are widely regarded as carrying forward the work of the Nobel Prize-winning economist Robert F. Engle, as acknowledged by Engle himself.

== Works ==
Trend, Seasonal and Sectorial Inflation in the Euro Area (with James Stock), Jan. 2019.

Aggregate Implications of Changing Sectoral Trends (with Andrew Foerster, Andreas Hornstein, and Pierre-Daniel Sarte), Revised Jul. 2020

Low-Frequency Analysis of Economic Time Series (with Ulrich Müller ), September 2020, Draft Chapter for the Handbook of Econometrics, Vol. 7, edited by S. Durlauf, L.P. Hansen, J.J. Heckman, and R. Matzkin.

Business Cycle Properties of Selected U.S. Economic Time Series, 1959-1988 (with James H. Stock), NBER WP 3376 1990.

Confidence Sets in Regressions with Highly Serially Correlated Regressors (with James H. Stock), Revised December 1996.

Empirical Bayes Regression With Many Regressors (with Thomas Knox and James H. Stock), Revised January 2004.

Optimal Tests for Reduced Rank Time Variation in Regression Coefficients and Level Variation in the Multivariate Local Level Model (with Piotr Eliasz and James H. Stock), Revised October 2004.

Implications of Dynamic Factor Models for VAR Analysis (with James H. Stock), Revised June 2005.

Measuring Changes in the Value of the Numeraire (with Ricardo Reis), May 2007
