= Laurent-Emmanuel Calvet =

French economist (born 1969)

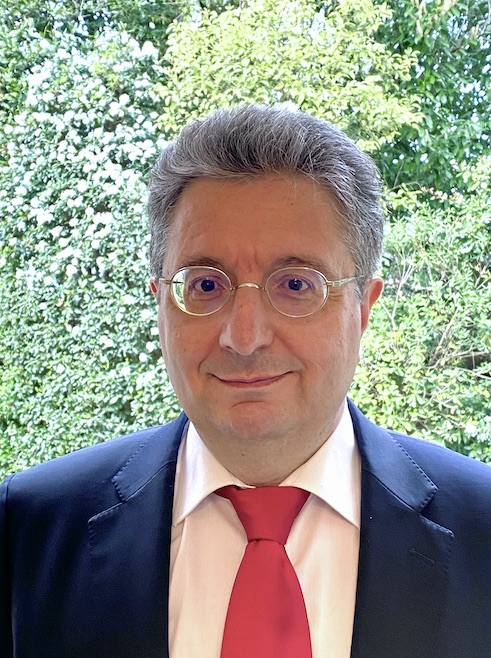
- Born: 28 February 1969 (age 57); Les Lilas, France
- Education: Yale University; École des Ponts ParisTech; École Polytechnique
- Scientific career
- Fields: Financial economics
- Doctoral advisors: John Geanakoplos; Benoit Mandelbrot; Peter C. B. Phillips

Laurent-Emmanuel Calvet (born 28 February 1969) is a French economist and a professor of finance. He is President of the European Finance Association.

Calvet is a Professor of Finance at SKEMA Business School. He previously held faculty positions at Harvard University, HEC Paris, Imperial College London, and EDHEC Business School.

Calvet is a founding member of the Centre for Economic Policy Research's Household Finance Research Network. He serves on the Advisory Scientific Committee of the European Systemic Risk Board.

== Early years ==
Calvet was born on 28 February 1969. He attended Lycée Janson de Sailly and Lycée Louis-le-Grand in Paris. He obtained engineering degrees from École Polytechnique in 1991 and École des ponts ParisTech in 1994. He went on to complete his M.A., M.Phil. and Ph.D. (1998) in economics from Yale University.

== Academic career ==
Calvet served as an assistant professor and then as the John Loeb associate professor of the Social Sciences at Harvard University from 1998 to 2004. He taught finance at HEC Paris from 2004 to 2016, Imperial College London from 2007 to 2008, and EDHEC Business School from 2016 to 2023. Specialist in asset pricing, household finance, and volatility modelling, Laurent Calvet joined SKEMA Business School in 2023 as a professor of finance.

In 2006, Calvet received the "Best Finance Researcher under the Age of 40" award from Le Monde and the Europlace Institute of Finance.

Calvet is the current President of the European Finance Association. In 2025, he served as Program Chair of the association's annual meeting.

== Contributions ==
Calvet is known for his research in financial economics, household finance, and econometrics. He pioneered with Adlai Fisher the Markov switching multifractal model of financial volatility, which is used by academics and financial practitioners to forecast volatility, compute value-at-risk, and price derivatives. This approach is summarized in the book Multifractal Volatility: Theory, Forecasting and Pricing (2008).

In a 2007 publication, Laurent E. Calvet, John Y. Campbell and Paolo Sodini show that households hold well-diversified portfolios of financial assets, consistent with the predictions of portfolio theory. This result confirms a key assumption of the Capital asset pricing model. Subsequent work confirms that household follow other important precepts of financial theory, such as portfolio rebalancing and habit formation.

Calvet has also contributed to statistical filtering theory. He developed with Veronika Czellar and Elvezio Ronchetti robust filtering techniques that can withstand model misspecifications and outliers. The robust filter naturally solves the degeneracy problem that plagues the particle filter of Gordon, Salmond, and Smith and its many extensions.

== See also ==
- Financial risk
- Fractal
- Markov chain
- Modern portfolio theory
- Multifractal system
