= Carr–Madan formula =

Formula in financial mathematics

In financial mathematics, the Carr–Madan formula of Peter Carr and Dilip B. Madan shows that the analytical solution of the European option price can be obtained once the explicit form of the characteristic function of $\log S_T$, where $S_T$ is the price of the underlying asset at maturity time $T$, is available. This analytical solution is in the form of the Fourier transform, which then allows for the fast Fourier transform to be employed to numerically compute option values and Greeks in an efficient manner.
