= Heston model =

Model in finance

In finance, the Heston model, named after Steven L. Heston, is a mathematical model that describes the evolution of the volatility of an underlying asset. It is a stochastic volatility model: such a model assumes that the volatility of the asset is not constant, nor even deterministic, but follows a random process.

== Mathematical formulation ==
The Heston model assumes that S_{t}, the price of the asset, is determined by a stochastic process,

$$dS_t = \mu S_t\,dt + \sqrt{\nu_t} S_t\,dW^S_t,$$

where the volatility $\sqrt{\nu_t}$ is given by a Feller square-root or CIR process,

$$d\nu_t = \kappa(\theta - \nu_t)\,dt + \xi \sqrt{\nu_t}\,dW^{\nu}_t,$$

and $W^S_t, W^{\nu}_t$ are Wiener processes (i.e., continuous random walks) with correlation ρ. The value $\nu_t$, being the square of the volatility, is called the instantaneous variance.

The model has five parameters:

- $\nu_0$, the initial variance.
- $\theta$, the long variance, or long-run average variance of the price; as t tends to infinity, the expected value of ν_{t} tends to θ.
- $\rho$, the correlation of the two Wiener processes.
- $\kappa$, the rate at which ν_{t} reverts to θ.
- $\xi$, the volatility of the volatility, or 'vol of vol', which determines the variance of ν_{t}.

If the parameters obey the following condition (known as the Feller condition) then the process $\nu_t$ is strictly positive

$$2 \kappa \theta > \xi^2.$$

== Risk-neutral measure ==
A fundamental concept in derivatives pricing is the risk-neutral measure; this is explained in further depth in the above article. For our purposes, it is sufficient to note the following:

1. To price a derivative whose payoff is a function of one or more underlying assets, we evaluate the expected value of its discounted payoff under a risk-neutral measure.
2. A risk-neutral measure, also known as an equivalent martingale measure, is one which is equivalent to the real-world measure, and which is arbitrage-free: under such a measure, the discounted price of each of the underlying assets is a martingale. See Girsanov's theorem.
3. In the Black-Scholes and Heston frameworks (where filtrations are generated from a linearly independent set of Wiener processes alone), any equivalent measure can be described in a very loose sense by adding a drift to each of the Wiener processes.
4. By selecting certain values for the drifts described above, we may obtain an equivalent measure which fulfills the arbitrage-free condition.

Consider a general situation where we have $n$ underlying assets and a linearly independent set of $m$ Wiener processes. The set of equivalent measures is isomorphic to R^{m}, the space of possible drifts. Consider the set of equivalent martingale measures to be isomorphic to a manifold $M$ embedded in R^{m}; initially, consider the situation where we have no assets and $M$ is isomorphic to R^{m}.

Now consider each of the underlying assets as providing a constraint on the set of equivalent measures, as its expected discount process must be equal to a constant (namely, its initial value). By adding one asset at a time, we may consider each additional constraint as reducing the dimension of $M$ by one dimension. Hence we can see that in the general situation described above, the dimension of the set of equivalent martingale measures is $m-n$.

In the Black-Scholes model, we have one asset and one Wiener process. The dimension of the set of equivalent martingale measures is zero; hence it can be shown that there is a single value for the drift, and thus a single risk-neutral measure, under which the discounted asset $e^{-\rho t}S_t$ will be a martingale.

In the Heston model, we still have one asset (volatility is not considered to be directly observable or tradeable in the market) but we now have two Wiener processes - the first in the Stochastic Differential Equation (SDE) for the stock price and the second in the SDE for the variance of the stock price. Here, the dimension of the set of equivalent martingale measures is one; there is no unique risk-free measure.

This is of course problematic; while any of the risk-free measures may theoretically be used to price a derivative, it is likely that each of them will give a different price. In theory, however, only one of these risk-free measures would be compatible with the market prices of volatility-dependent options (for example, European calls, or more explicitly, variance swaps). Hence we could add a volatility-dependent asset; by doing so, we add an additional constraint, and thus choose a single risk-free measure which is compatible with the market. This measure may be used for pricing.

== Implementation ==
- The use of the Fourier transform to value options was shown by Carr and Madan.
- A discussion of the implementation of the Heston model was given by Kahl and Jäckel.
- A derivation of closed-form option prices for the time-dependent Heston model was presented by Benhamou et al.
- A derivation of closed-form option prices for the double Heston model was given by Christoffersen et al. and by Gauthier and Possamai.
- An extension of the Heston model with stochastic interest rates was given by Grzelak and Oosterlee.
- An expression of the characteristic function of the Heston model that is both numerically continuous and easily differentiable with respect to the parameters was introduced by Cui et al.
- The use of the model in a local stochastic volatility context was given by van der Weijst.
- An explicit solution of the Heston price equation in terms of the volatility was developed by Kouritzin. This can be combined with known weak solutions for the volatility equation and Girsanov's theorem to produce explicit weak solutions of the Heston model. Such solutions are useful for efficient simulation.
- High precision reference prices are available in a blog post by Alan Lewis.
- There are few known parameterisations of the volatility surface based on the Heston model (Schonbusher, SVI and gSVI).

== Calibration ==
The calibration of the Heston model is often formulated as a least squares problem, with the objective function minimizing the squared difference between the prices observed in the market and those calculated from the model.

The prices are typically those of vanilla options. Sometimes the model is also calibrated to the variance swap term-structure as in Guillaume and Schoutens. Yet another approach is to include forward start options, or barrier options as well, in order to capture the forward smile.

Under the Heston model, the price of vanilla options is given analytically, but requires a numerical method to compute the integral. Le Floc'h summarized the various quadratures applied and proposed an efficient adaptive Filon quadrature.

Calibration usually requires the gradient of the objective function with respect to the model parameters. This was usually computed with a finite difference approximation although it is less accurate, less efficient and less elegant than an analytical gradient because an insightful expression of the latter became available only when a new representation of the characteristic function was introduced by Cui et al. in 2017. Another possibility is to resort to automatic differentiation. For example, the tangent mode of algorithmic differentiation may be applied using dual numbers in a straightforward manner.

== See also ==
- Stochastic volatility
- Risk-neutral measure (another name for the equivalent martingale measure)
- Girsanov's theorem
- Martingale (probability theory)
- SABR volatility model
- MATLAB code for implementation by Kahl, Jäckel and Lord
