= Steven L. Heston =

American mathematician, economist, and financier

- Education: Carnegie Mellon University, Ph.D.
- Known for: Quantitative research; investment modelling
- Scientific career
- Fields: Economics; Mathematics; Finance; Investment strategies
- Thesis: Testing Continuous Time Models of the Term Structure of Interest Rates (1990)

Steven "Steve" L. Heston is an American mathematician, economist, and financier. He's also prominently active in the field of gambling-related research, where he sometimes uses the pen name Kim Lee.

== Education ==
Heston studied Mathematics and Economics at the University of Maryland, where he obtained his B.S. In 1985, he completed his M.B.A. studies in Industrial Administration at the Carnegie Mellon University's Graduate School of Industrial Administration. From the same university, Carnegie Mellon, in 1987, he received his M.S. in Finance and in 1990 his Ph.D.

== Academic career ==
Heston was at the Yale School of Organization and Management from 1989 until 1993, a Visiting Assistant Professor of Finance at the Columbia Business School until 1994, and Assistant Professor of Finance at the Washington University in St. Louis until 1998.

Heston is currently, and since 2002, Professor of Finance at Robert H. Smith School of Business at University of Maryland, College Park.

== Career in finance ==
Heston is known for analyzing options with stochastic volatility.

From 1998 to 2002, Heston worked as Vice President of U.S. Arbitrage and also of Quantitative Equities, in Goldman Sachs, New York.

Heston is the originator of the eponymous Heston model, a mathematical formulation describing the evolution of an underlying asset's volatility.

== Gambling-related research ==
Heston, under his own name or the pen name "Kim Lee," has written extensively on issues related to the games of poker and casino blackjack, and gambling-related issues, in general. He is also active in online message boards on issues related to the mathematics of gambling.

Heston is the author of numerous articles and texts on the game of blackjack, often participating in teams' strategy formulation, on issues ranging from simple card counting and bankroll management to more advanced advantage-techniques.

Heston is co-author of two highly praised books on tournament poker: Along with Blair Rodman and Lee Nelson, of Kill Phil, and, with Lee Nelson and professional poker tournament player Tysen Streib, of the subsequent Kill Everyone. The titles are a word play combining the title of the Quentin Tarantino movie Kill Bill and the name of Phil Hellmuth, professional poker player and winner of multiple tournaments, with a significant number of WSOP bracelets.
