= Clive Granger =

British economist and Nobel laureate (1934–2009)

Sir Clive Granger
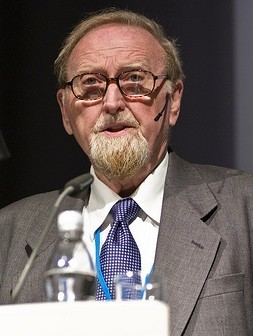
- Granger in 2008
- Born: 4 September 1934; Swansea, Wales, U.K.
- Died: 27 May 2009 (aged 74); San Diego, California, U.S.

Academic background
- Education: University of Nottingham
- Doctoral advisor: Harry Pitt
- Influences: David Hendry; Norbert Wiener; John Denis Sargan; Alok Bhargava

Academic work
- Discipline: Financial economics Econometrics
- Institutions: Erasmus University Rotterdam; University of California, San Diego; University of Nottingham
- Doctoral students: Heather M. Anderson; Tim Bollerslev; Kuan Chung-ming; Mark Watson
- Notable ideas: Cointegration; Granger causality Autoregressive fractionally integrated moving average
- Awards: Nobel Memorial Prize in Economic Sciences (2003)
- Website: Information at IDEAS / RePEc

Sir Clive William John Granger (/ˈɡreɪndʒər/; 4 September 1934 – 27 May 2009) was a British econometrician known for his contributions to nonlinear time series analysis. He taught in Britain, at the University of Nottingham and in the United States, at the University of California, San Diego. Granger was awarded the Nobel Memorial Prize in Economic Sciences in 2003 in recognition of the contributions that he and his co-winner, Robert F. Engle, had made to the analysis of time series data. This work fundamentally changed the way in which economists analyse financial and macroeconomic data.

== Biography ==
=== Early life ===
Clive Granger was born in 1934 in Swansea, south Wales, United Kingdom, to Edward John Granger and Evelyn Granger. The next year his parents moved to Lincoln.

During World War II Granger and his mother moved to Cambridge because Edward joined the Royal Air Force and deployed to North Africa. Here they stayed first with Evelyn's mother, then later Edward's parents, while Clive began school. Clive would later recall a primary school teacher telling his mother that "[Clive] would never be successful".

Clive started secondary school in Cambridge, but continued in Nottingham, where his family moved after the war. Here two teachers encouraged Granger's interest in physics and applied mathematics. He had anticipated following the convention of completing schooling at age 16 to enter the workforce and saw himself working in a bank or insurance company. However, positive social influence from his peers and support from his father led him to enroll in sixth-form for two years as preparation for a university degree.

Granger enrolled in a joint degree in economics and mathematics at the University of Nottingham but switched to full mathematics in his second year. After receiving his BA in 1955, he remained at the University of Nottingham for a PhD in statistics under the supervision of Harry Pitt.

In 1956, aged 21, Granger was appointed a junior lecturer in statistics at the university. His interest in applied statistics and economics led him to choose as the topic of his doctoral thesis time series analysis, a field in which he felt that relatively little work had been done at the time. In 1959 Granger completed his PhD degree with a thesis titled "Testing for Non-stationarity".

=== Academic life ===
Granger spent the next academic year, 1959–60, at Princeton University under a Harkness Fellowship of the Commonwealth Fund. He had been invited to Princeton by Oskar Morgenstern to participate in his Econometrics Research Project. Here, Granger and Michio Hatanaka as assistants to John Tukey on a project using Fourier analysis on economic data.

In 1964, Granger and Hatanaka published the results of their research in a book on Spectral Analysis of Economic Time Series (Tukey had encouraged them to write this themselves, as he was not going to publish the research results.) In 1963, Granger also wrote an article on "The typical spectral shape of an economic variable", which appeared in Econometrica in 1966. Both the book and the article proved influential in the adoption of the new methods.

Granger also became a full professor at the University of Nottingham.

In a 1969 paper in Econometrica, Granger also introduced his concept of Granger causality.

After reading a pre-print copy of the time series book by George Box and Gwilym Jenkins in 1968, Granger became interested in forecasting. For the next few years he worked on this subject with his post-doctoral student, Paul Newbold; and they wrote a book which became a standard reference in time series forecasting (published in 1977). Using simulations, Granger and Newbold also wrote the famous 1974 paper on spurious regression which led to a re-evaluation of previous empirical work in economics and to the econometric methodology.

Granger spent 22 years at the University of Nottingham. In 2005, the building that houses the Economics and Geography Departments was renamed the Sir Clive Granger Building in honor of his Nobel prize award.

In 1974 Granger moved to the University of California at San Diego. In 1975 he participated in a US Bureau of Census committee, chaired by Arnold Zellner, on seasonal adjustment. At UCSD, Granger continued his research on time series, collaborating closely with Nobel prize co-recipient Robert Engle (whom he helped bring to UCSD), Roselyne Joyeux (on fractional integration), Timo Teräsvirta (on nonlinear time series) and others. Working with Robert Engle, he developed the concept of cointegration, introduced in a 1987 joint paper in Econometrica; for which he was awarded the Nobel prize in 2003.

Granger also supervised many PhD students, including Mark Watson (co-advisor with Robert Engle).

In later years Granger also used time series methods to analyse data outside economics. He worked on a project forecasting deforestation in the Amazon rainforest. In 2003, Granger retired from UCSD as a professor emeritus. He was a Visiting Eminent Scholar of the University of Melbourne and the University of Canterbury. He was a supporter of the Campaign for the Establishment of a United Nations Parliamentary Assembly, an organisation which campaigns for democratic reform of the United Nations.

Granger was married to Patricia (Lady Granger) from 1960 until his death. He was survived by their son, Mark William John, and their daughter, Claire Amanda Jane.

Granger died on 27 May 2009, at Scripps Memorial Hospital in La Jolla, California.

== Honors and awards ==
In 2003, Granger and his collaborator Robert Engle were jointly awarded the Nobel Memorial Prize in Economic Sciences. He was made a Knight Bachelor in the New Year's Honours in 2005.

Granger was a fellow of the Econometric Society since 1972 and a Corresponding Fellow of the British Academy since 2002. In 2004, he was voted as one of the 100 Welsh Heroes.

== See also ==
- Gabor–Granger method
- Granger causality

== Publications ==
- Granger, C.W.J. (1966). "The typical spectral shape of an economic variable". Econometrica. 34 (1): 150–61. doi:10.2307/1909859. JSTOR 1909859.
- Granger, C.W.J. (1969). "Investigating causal relations by econometric models and cross-spectral methods". Econometrica. 37 (3): 424–38. doi:10.2307/1912791. JSTOR 1912791.
- Granger, C.W.J.; Bates, J. (1969). "The combination of forecasts". Journal of the Operational Research Society. 20 (4): 451–68. doi:10.1057/jors.1969.103.
- Granger, C.W.J.; Hatanaka, M. (1964). Spectral Analysis of Economic Time Series. Princeton, NJ: Princeton University Press. ISBN 978-0-691-04177-3.
- Morgenstern, Oskar; Granger, Clive W.J. (1970). Predictability of stock market prices. Lexington, Massachusetts: Lexington Books (D.C. Heath and Company). pp. xxiii+303.
- Granger, C.W.J.; Joyeux, R. (1980). "An introduction to long-memory time series models and fractional differencing". Journal of Time Series Analysis. 1: 15–30. doi:10.1111/j.1467-9892.1980.tb00297.x.
- Granger, C.W.J.; Newbold, P. (1974). "Spurious regressions in econometrics". Journal of Econometrics. 2 (2): 111–20. doi:10.1016/0304-4076(74)90034-7.
- Granger, C.W.J.; Newbold, P. (1977). Forecasting Economic Time Series. Academic Press. ISBN 978-0-12-295150-3.
- Engle, Robert F.; Granger, C.W.J. (1987). "Co-Integration and Error Correction: Representation, Estimation, and Testing" (PDF). Econometrica. 55 (2): 251–76. doi:10.2307/1913236. JSTOR 1913236. S2CID 16616066.

Awards
Preceded by Daniel Kahneman; Vernon L. Smith	Laureate of the Nobel Memorial Prize in Economics; 2003; Served alongside: Robert F. Engle III	Succeeded by Finn E. Kydland; Edward C. Prescott
