= Tim Bollerslev =

Danish economist (born 1958)

- Born: May 11, 1958 (age 68); Copenhagen, Denmark

Academic background
- Education: Aarhus University (MSc); University of California, San Diego (PhD)
- Doctoral advisor: Robert F. Engle

Academic work
- Discipline: Econometrics; Financial economics Macroeconomics
- School or tradition: Neoclassical economics
- Institutions: Duke University; NBER
- Notable ideas: GARCH
- Website: Information at IDEAS / RePEc

Tim Peter Bollerslev (born May 11, 1958) is a Danish economist, currently the Juanita and Clifton Kreps Professor of Economics at Duke University. A fellow of the Econometric Society, Bollerslev is known for his ideas for measuring and forecasting financial market volatility and for the GARCH (generalized autoregressive conditional heteroskedasticity) model.

== Biography ==
Tim Bollerslev received his MSc in economics and mathematics in 1983 from the Aarhus University in Denmark. He continued his studies in the U.S., earning his Ph.D. in 1986 from the University of California at San Diego with a thesis titled Generalized Autoregressive Conditional Heteroskedasticity with Applications in Finance written under the supervision of Robert F. Engle (Nobel Prize in Economics winner in 2003).

After his graduate studies, Bollerslev taught at the Northwestern University between 1986 and 1995 and at the University of Virginia between 1996 and 1998. Since 1998 he is the Juanita and Clifton Kreps Professor of Economics at Duke University.

He and Mark Watson are widely regarded as carrying forward the work of the Nobel Prize-winning economist Robert F. Engle, as acknowledged by Engle himself.

He was a co-editor of the Journal of Applied Econometrics.

== Articles ==
- Bollerslev, Tim (1986). "Generalized Autoregressive Conditional Heteroskedasticity". Journal of Econometrics. 31 (3): 307–327. doi:10.1016/0304-4076(86)90063-1.
- Bollerslev, Tim (1987). "A Conditional Heteroskedastic Time Series Model for Speculative Prices and Rates of Return" (PDF). The Review of Economics and Statistics. 69 (3): 542–547. doi:10.2307/1925546. JSTOR 1925546. S2CID 153961922. Archived from the original (PDF) on 2019-12-30.
- Bollerslev, Tim (1988). "A Capital Asset Pricing Model with Time-Varying Covariances". Journal of Political Economy. 96 (1): 116–131. doi:10.1086/261527. hdl:10161/1988. S2CID 154155751.
- Bollerslev, Tim (1990). "Modeling the Coherence in Short-run Nominal Exchange Rates: A Multivariate Generalized ARCH Model". The Review of Economics and Statistics. 72 (3): 498–505. doi:10.2307/2109358. JSTOR 2109358.
- Bollerslev, Tim (1992). "ARCH Modeling in Finance: A Review of the Theory and Empirical Evidence". Journal of Econometrics. 52 (1–2): 5–59. doi:10.1016/0304-4076(92)90064-x.
