= Robert F. Engle =

American economist and Nobel laureate (born 1942)

Robert F. Engle III
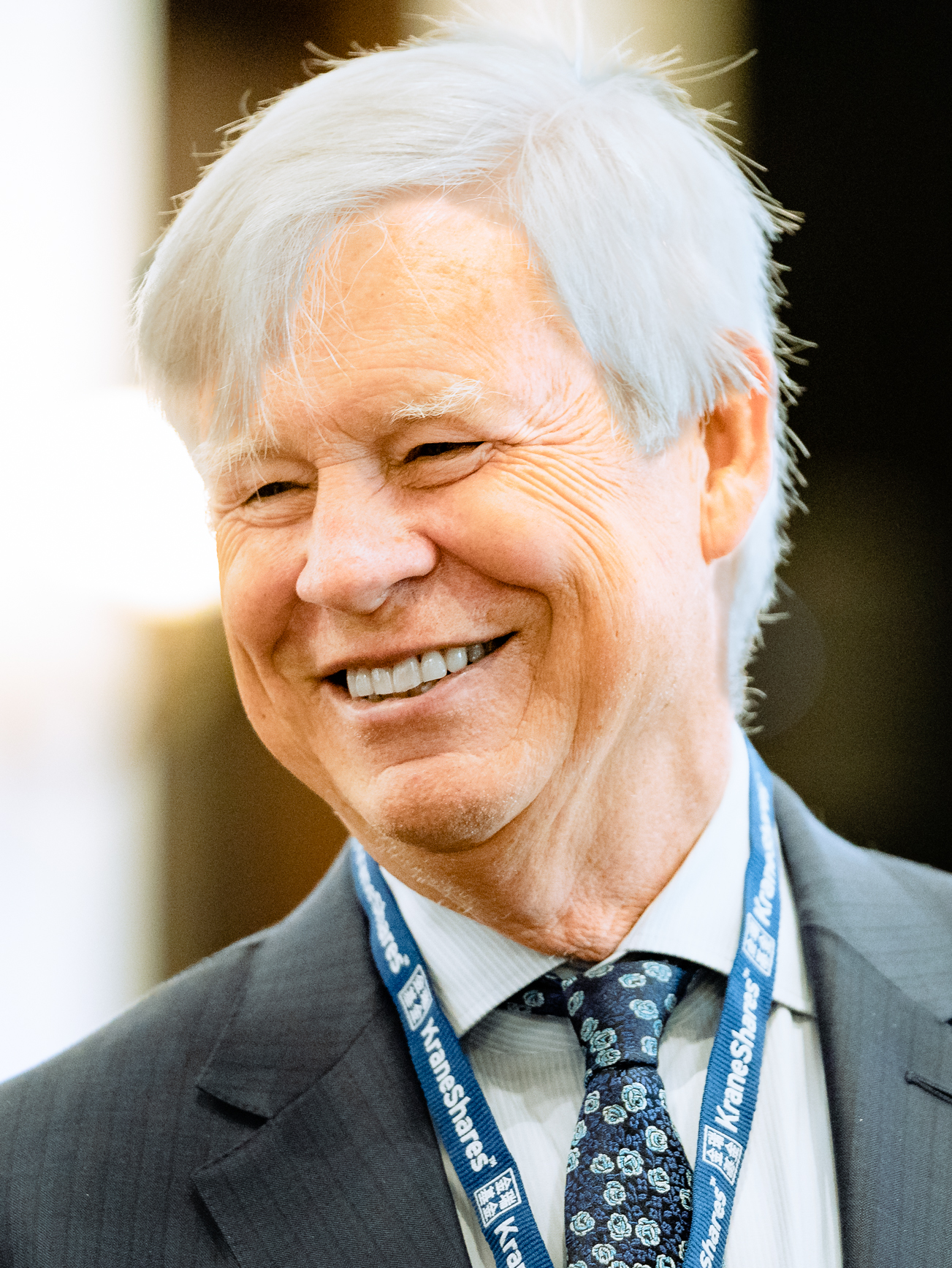
- Engle in 2022
- Born: November 10, 1942 (age 84); Syracuse, New York, U.S.

Academic background
- Education: Williams College (BS); Cornell University (MS, PhD)
- Thesis: Biases From Time-Aggregation of Distributed Lag Models (1969)
- Doctoral advisor: Ta-Chung Liu
- Influences: David Hendry

Academic work
- Discipline: Econometrics
- Institutions: New York University, since 2000; University of California, San Diego, (1975–2003); Massachusetts Institute of Technology, (1969–1975)
- Doctoral students: Mark Watson; Tim Bollerslev
- Notable ideas: ARCH; Cointegration
- Awards: Nobel Memorial Prize in Economic Sciences (2003)
- Website: Information at IDEAS / RePEc

Robert Fry Engle III (born November 10, 1942) is an American economist and statistician. He was awarded the 2003 Nobel Memorial Prize in Economic Sciences, sharing the award with Clive Granger, "for methods of analyzing economic time series with time-varying volatility (ARCH)".

== Biography ==
Engle was born in Syracuse, New York into a Quaker family and went on to graduate from Williams College with a B.S. in physics. He earned a M.S. in physics and a Ph.D. in economics, both from Cornell University, in 1966 and 1969 respectively. After completing his PhD, Engle taught at the Massachusetts Institute of Technology from 1969 to 1975. He joined the faculty of the University of California, San Diego (UCSD) in 1975, wherefrom he retired in 2003. He now holds positions of professor emeritus and research professor at UCSD. He joined New York University's Stern School of Business in 2000 and is now professor emeritus of finance and co-director of its Volatility and Risk Institute.

Engle's most important contribution was his path-breaking discovery of a method for analyzing unpredictable movements in financial market prices and interest rates. Accurate characterization and prediction of these volatile movements are essential for quantifying and effectively managing risk. For example, risk measurement plays a key role in pricing options and financial derivatives. Previous researchers had either assumed constant volatility or had used simple devices to approximate it. Engle developed new statistical models of volatility that captured the tendency of stock prices and other financial variables to move between high volatility and low volatility periods ("Autoregressive Conditional Heteroskedasticity: ARCH"). These statistical models have become essential tools of modern arbitrage pricing theory and practice.

Engle was the central founder and director of NYU-Stern's Volatility Institute which publishes weekly data on systemic risk across countries on its V-LAB site. He was awarded a Doctor Honoris Causa by the Comillas Pontifical University in Spain in 2024.

== Personal life ==
In August 1969, Engle married Marianne Eger. They have two children, a daughter and a son. His wife’s mother is Edith Eger, a clinical psychologist, author, and survivor of the Holocaust.

== Selected works ==
- Engle, Robert F. (1982). "Autoregressive Conditional Heteroscedasticity with Estimates of the Variance of United Kingdom Inflation". Econometrica. 50 (4): 987–1008. doi:10.2307/1912773. JSTOR 1912773.
- Engle, Robert F.; Hendry, David F.; Richard, Jean-Francois (1983). "Exogeneity". Econometrica. 51 (2). (with David F. Hendry and Jean-Francois Richard): 277–304. doi:10.2307/1911990. JSTOR 1911990.
- Engle, Robert F.; Granger, C. W. J.; Rice, John; Weiss, Andrew (1986). "Semi-parametric Estimates of the Relation between Weather and Electricity Demand". J. Amer. Statist. Assoc. 81 (394): 310–320. doi:10.1080/01621459.1986.10478274.
- Engle, Robert F.; Granger, C.W.J. (1987). "Co-Integration and Error Correction: Representation, Estimation, and Testing" (PDF). Econometrica. 55 (2). (with Clive Granger): 251–276. doi:10.2307/1913236. JSTOR 1913236. S2CID 16616066.
- Engle, Robert F.; Lilien, David M.; Robins, Russell P. (1987). "Estimation of Time Varying Risk Premia in the Term Structure: the ARCH-M Model". Econometrica. 55 (2). (with David Lilien and Russell Robins): 391–407. doi:10.2307/1913242. JSTOR 1913242.
- Engle, Robert F.; Ng, Victor K.; Rothschild, Michael (1990). "Asset Pricing with a Factor ARCH Covariance Structure: Empirical Estimates for Treasury Bills" (PDF). Journal of Econometrics. 45 (1–2): 213–237. doi:10.1016/0304-4076(90)90099-F. hdl:2027.42/28496. S2CID 55667632.
- Engle, Robert F.; Russell, Jeffrey R. (1998). "Autoregressive Conditional Duration: A New Model for Irregularly Spaced Transaction Data". Econometrica. 66 (5). (with J.R. Russell): 1127–1162. doi:10.2307/2999632. JSTOR 2999632.
- "Dynamic Conditional Correlation – A Simple Class of Multivariate GARCH Models". Journal of Business and Economic Statistics. 20 (3): 339–350. 2002. doi:10.1198/073500102288618487. S2CID 14784060.
- Easley, D.; Engle, R.F.; O'Hara, M.; Wu, L. (2008). "Time-Varying Arrival Rates of Informed and Uninformed Traders". Journal of Financial Econometrics. 6 (2). (with Maureen O'Hara, David Easley and L. Wu): 171–207. doi:10.1093/jjfinec/nbn003.

== See also ==
- Modeling and analysis of financial markets

Awards
Preceded by Daniel Kahneman; Vernon L. Smith	Laureate of the Nobel Memorial Prize in Economics; 2003; Served alongside: Clive W.J. Granger	Succeeded by Finn E. Kydland; Edward C. Prescott
