= Volatility risk =

Risk arising from changes in market volatility affecting the value of financial positions

Volatility risk is the risk of an adverse change of price, due to changes in the volatility of a factor affecting that price. It usually applies to derivative instruments, and their portfolios, where the volatility of the underlying asset is a major influencer of option prices. It is also relevant to portfolios of basic assets, and to foreign currency trading.

Volatility risk can be managed by hedging with appropriate financial instruments. These are volatility swaps, variance swaps, conditional variance swaps, variance options, VIX futures for equities, and (with some construction) caps, floors and swaptions for interest rates. Here, the hedge-instrument is sensitive to the same source of volatility as the asset being protected (i.e. the same stock, commodity, or interest rate etc.). The position is then established such that a change in the value of the protected-asset, is offset by a change in value of the hedge-instrument. The number of hedge-instruments purchased, will be a function of the relative sensitivity to volatility of the two: the measure of sensitivity is vega, the rate of change of the value of the option, or option-portfolio, with respect to the volatility of the underlying asset.

Option traders often seek to create "vega neutral" positions, typically as part of an options trading strategy. The value of an at-the-money straddle, for example, is extremely dependent on changes to volatility. Once neutrality is established, the total vega of the position is (near) zero — i.e. the impact of implied volatility is negated — allowing the trader to gain exposure to the specific opportunity, without concern for changing volatility.

== See also ==
- Financial risk management
- Implied volatility
  - Volatility smile
  - IVX
- Market risk
- Model risk § Uncertainty on volatility
- Volatility arbitrage
- Value at risk
- Volatility beta
- Volatility risk premium
