= Put/call ratio =

Stock market indicator

In finance the put/call ratio (or put-call ratio, PCR) is a technical indicator demonstrating investor sentiment. The ratio represents a proportion between all the put options and all the call options purchased on any given day. The put/call ratio can be calculated for any individual stock, as well as for any index, or can be aggregated. For example, Cboe volume and put/call ratio data is compiled for the convenience of site visitors.

== Readings ==
Generally, a lower reading (~0.6) of the ratio reflects a bullish sentiment among investors as they buy more calls, anticipating an uptrend. Conversely, a higher reading (~1.02) of the ratio indicates a bearish sentiment in the market. However, the ratio is considered to be a contrarian indicator, so that an extreme reading above 1.0 is actually a bullish signal and vice versa.

The lowest level of the index was 0.39, set in March 2000 at the peak of the dot-com bubble.

== Calculation variants ==
The put/call ratio may be calculated using different sets of options data. Market-data providers commonly publish separate ratios for total options, equity options, index options, exchange-traded products, and individual products such as the VIX. Because these categories may reflect different types of trading activity, the interpretation of a put/call ratio can vary depending on whether the ratio is based on broad market data, index options, or individual equity options.

The ratio is most commonly calculated from options trading volume, but related measures may also be based on open interest. Volume measures trading activity during a period, while open interest measures outstanding contracts that remain open. The distinction is relevant because a volume-based put/call ratio may reflect short-term trading activity, whereas an open-interest-based ratio may reflect existing positioning in the options market.

== See also ==
- IVX – Intraday, VIX-like volatility index
- VIX – Chicago Board Options Exchange Volatility index
