= Greed and fear =

Emotional states in investing

Greed and fear refer to two opposing emotional states theorized as factors causing the unpredictability and volatility of the stock market, and irrational market behavior inconsistent with the efficient-market hypothesis. Greed and fear relate to an old Wall Street saying: "financial markets are driven by two powerful emotions – greed and fear."

Greed and fear are among the animal spirits that Keynes identified as profoundly affecting economies and markets. Warren Buffett found an investing rule in acting contrary to such prevailing moods, advising that the timing of buying or selling stocks should be "fearful when others are greedy and greedy only when others are fearful." He uses the overall Market capitalization-to-GDP ratio to indicate relative value of the stock market in general, hence this ratio has become known as the "Buffett indicator".

== Greed ==
Greed is usually described as an irresistible craving to possess more of something (money, material goods) than one actually needs.

According to several academics, greed, like love, has the power to send a chemical rush through our brains that forces us to put aside our common sense and self-control and thus provoke changes in our brains and body. However, there is no generally accepted research on physiology of greed.

Other academics tend to compare greed to an addiction, because greed, like smoking and drinking, can illustrate that if a person can take over one's addictions it is possible to avert bad effects from resisting it. On the other hand, if one can not resist its temptations, he can easily get swept away by it. In other words, it can be deduced that certain traders who join the business world for the emotional agitation and desire of hitting that emotional high, are addicted to the release of certain brain chemicals that determine those states of happiness, euphoria and relaxation. Before mentioned fact can also imply that such traders are susceptible to all addictions. Furthermore, humans' brains are naturally activated by financial awards, which in the same way as drugs produce an incredible but perilous feeling and thus an addictive experience.

=== Dot-com bubble ===
One of the most common examples of situations where greed took over people's actions is the 1990s dot-com bubble.

The dot-com bubble, also known as the Internet bubble, is the speculative investment bubble that was created around new internet startup companies between the years 1995–2000. In that time, exorbitant prices of new Internet companies motivated investors to invest into companies whose business plans included a "dot com" domain. Investors became greedy, creating further greed, resulting in securities being heavily overpriced, which eventually created a bubble.

== Fear ==
The emotion of fear is usually characterised as an inconvenient, stressful state, triggered by impending peril and awareness of hazard.

The Internet bubble is not only a good example of investors' greed but also the period following the bubble can serve as a good characteristic for fear induced market.

In pursuance of solutions to suppress their losses after the Internet bubble crash, fearful investors decided to swiftly move out of the stock markets concentrating their attention on less uncertain purchases, spurring their capital into stable value funds, principal protected funds and low risk and return investments in general. Such behaviour is an example of a complete negligence of long term investing plan which is based on fundamentals. Investors disregarded their plans because of fear of committing persisting losses, which identically did not bring any profits and benefits.

== Greed vs hope ==
Some academics disagree with the notion that greed and fear are main emotions driving financial markets.

According to psychologist Lola Lopes, while fear is indeed a crucial factor driving financial markets, the majority of investors don't respond that much to greed but to hope. Lopes indicates that fear, unlike hope, provokes investors to concentrate on unprofitable invests, while hope does the complete opposite. Furthermore, hope and fear are believed to alter the manner in which investors estimate other possibilities. Fear provokes investors to ask: How bad can it get?, while hope: How good can it get?. In this case, fear drives investors to enhance security, while hope stimulates investors to emphasise potential.

Market Fear is one of the strongest emotions in the financial markets. Fear can lead to market crashes. Market fear does not follow a random path. It is usually anti-persistent, but in times of crisis it becomes more persistent, indicating the impact of the crowd effects. The fact that the long-term characteristics of market fear are volatile and change over time is an important result that can lead to a better understanding of financial market behavior. Fear of Missing Out can lead to price bubbles.

== How to measure greed and fear ==
One of the best available and accepted tools to measure stock market volatility is CBOE Volatility Index, elaborated by Chicago Board Options Exchange in 1993. In other words, VIX can be defined as a sentiment ratio of Wall Street's fear or greed gauge. It is usually used by traders to check the grade of investor complacency or market fear.

In practice, VIX is usually called the fear index. In case of increased VIX index, investors' sentiment leans toward higher volatility which corresponds to higher risk. If a VIX reading is under 20 it usually indicates that investors became less concerned; however, if the reading exceeds 30 it implies that investors are more fearful because prices of the options increased and investors are more prone to pay more to preserve their assets.

=== How VIX works ===
By utilising short-term near-the-money put and call options, VIX gauges suggested volatility of S&P stock market index options through the forthcoming 30 days. Media usually quote the VIX because many investors consider the S&P 500 to be a reliable proxy for the entire market.

=== CNN Fear & Greed Index ===
There is also another available index that can gauge greed and fear developed by CNNMoney. The CNN Fear and Greed Index is based on seven indicators: Safe Haven Demand, Stock Price Momentum, Stock Price Strength, Stock Price Breadth, Put and Call Options, Junk Bond Demand, and Market Volatility.

All aforementioned indicators are separately gauged using scales from 0 to 100. A reading from 0 to 49 indicates fear. A reading of 50 is neutral. Readings from 51 to 100 demonstrate that investors are greedy. To calculate this index, a computer takes an equal-weighted average of those seven indicators.

Historical daily values of the CNN Fear & Greed Index, including interactive charts and detailed statistics dating back to 2011, are independently archived and made available online.

== See also ==
- Behavioural finance
- Behavioural economics
- Emotional bias
- Greed is good
- Hersh Shefrin
- S&P 500
- VIX
