= Conditional variance swap =

Type of financial derivative

A conditional variance swap is a type of variance swap or swap derivative product that allows investors to take exposure to volatility in the price of an underlying security but only while the underlying security is within a pre-specified price range. This instrument can be useful for hedging complex volatility exposures, making a bet on the volatility levels contained in the skew of the underlying security's price, or buying/selling variance at more attractive levels given a view on the underlying security.

== History ==
Regular variance swap were introduced first, and became a popular instrument for hedging against the effect of volatility on option prices. Thus, the market for these securities became increasingly liquid, and pricing for these swaps became more efficient. However, investors noticed that to a certain extent the price levels for these variance swaps still deviated from the theoretical price that would have resulted from replicating the portfolio of options underlying the swaps using options pricing formulas such as the Black–Scholes model. This was partly because the construction of the replicating portfolio includes a relatively large contribution from out-of-the-money options, which can often be illiquid and result in a pricing discrepancy in the overall swap.

Conditional swaps mitigate this problem by limiting the hedge to strikes within an upper and lower level of the underlying security. Thus, the volatility exposure is limited to when the underlying security lies within this corridor. Another problem in replicating variance swaps is that dealers rarely use a large collection of options over a large range to hedge a variance swap due to transaction costs and the cost of managing a large number of options. A conditional variance swap is attractive as it is easier to hedge and better fits the payoff profile of hedges used in practice.
