= Realized variance =

Measurement of price volatility

Realized variance or realised variance (RV, see spelling differences) is the sum of squared returns. For instance, the RV can be the sum of squared daily returns for a particular month, which would yield a measure of price variation over this month. More commonly, the realized variance is computed as the sum of squared intraday returns for a particular day.

The realized variance is useful because it provides a relatively accurate measure of volatility which is useful for many purposes, including volatility forecasting, forecast evaluation, risk management, and variance swap pricing.

== Related quantities ==
Unlike the variance the realized variance is a random quantity.

The realized volatility is the square root of the realized variance, or the square root of the RV multiplied by a suitable constant to bring the measure of volatility to an annualized scale. For instance, if the RV is computed as the sum of squared daily returns for some month, then an annualized realized volatility is given by $\sqrt{252 \times RV}$.

== Properties under ideal conditions ==
Under ideal circumstances the RV consistently estimates the quadratic variation of the price process that the returns are computed from.

For instance suppose that the price process $P_t=\exp{(p_t)}$ is given by the stochastic integral:

$$p_t = p_0 + \int_0^t \sigma_s dB_s$$,

where $B_s$ is a standard Brownian motion, and $\sigma_s$ is some (possibly random) process for which the integrated variance:

$$IV = \int_0^t \sigma_s^2 ds$$,

is well defined.

The realized variance based on $n$ intraday returns is given by $RV^{(n)} = \sum_{i=1}^n r_{i,n}^2$, where the intraday returns may be defined by:

$$r_{i,n} = p_{\frac{it}{n}}-p_{\frac{(i-1)t}{n}},\qquad i=1,\ldots,n$$.

Then it has been shown that, as $n\rightarrow\infty$ the realized variance converges to IV in probability. Moreover, the RV also converges in distribution in the sense that:

$$\sqrt{n}\frac{RV^{(n)}-IV}{\sqrt{2t\int_0^t \sigma_s^4 ds}}$$,

is approximately distributed as a standard normal random variables when $n$ is large.

== Estimation in practice ==
In theory, the precision of realized variance improves as the sampling frequency increases. In practice, however, very high frequency returns are contaminated by market microstructure effects such as bid–ask bounce, discreteness of prices, and irregular spacing of trades. This creates a bias–variance tradeoff: sampling too sparsely discards information, while sampling too frequently causes the RV estimate to diverge upward. The choice of sampling frequency and noise-robust estimator also has downstream consequences for forecasting accuracy, as reviewed in Leushuis and Petkov (2026).

The conventional choice in the literature is to use returns sampled at five-minute intervals, which was shown by Liu, Patton, and Sheppard (2015) to be difficult to improve upon across a broad range of assets and noise-robust estimators. Alternative approaches that allow for higher sampling frequencies while controlling for noise include subsampling and pre-averaging.

== Robust estimators ==
Several modifications of the standard realized variance have been proposed to handle jumps and microstructure noise.

Bipower variation, introduced by Barndorff-Nielsen and Shephard (2004), estimates the continuous component of quadratic variation and is robust to the presence of jumps in the price process. The difference between realized variance and bipower variation can be used as a nonparametric test for the presence of jumps in a given trading day.

The realized kernel estimator of Barndorff-Nielsen, Hansen, Lunde, and Shephard (2008) provides a consistent and asymptotically efficient estimate of integrated variance in the presence of market microstructure noise.

Realized semivariance, proposed by Barndorff-Nielsen, Kinnebrock, and Shephard (2010), decomposes realized variance into contributions from positive and negative returns, which is useful for studying the asymmetric impact of upside and downside moves on future volatility.

== Properties when prices are measured with noise ==
When prices are measured with noise the RV may not estimate the desired quantity. As the sampling frequency increases, bid–ask bounce and other microstructure effects increasingly contaminate intraday returns, causing the realized variance to diverge rather than converge to the integrated variance. This counterintuitive result motivated the development of a wide range of robust realized measures of volatility, such as the realized kernel estimator.

== Forecasting ==
Because realized variance treats volatility as an observed quantity rather than a latent variable, it can be forecast directly using standard time series methods. The most widely used framework is the heterogeneous autoregressive model (HAR) of Corsi (2009), which captures the long memory of realized variance through a parsimonious combination of daily, weekly, and monthly autoregressive components. Since its introduction, the HAR has been extended in several directions, notably by incorporating signed semi-variances to capture leverage effects and jump components to separate the continuous and discontinuous parts of quadratic variation.

Beyond linear econometric models, machine learning methods such as random forests and gradient boosting, as well as deep learning architectures including LSTM networks and Transformers, have increasingly been applied to realized variance forecasting, with Leushuis and Petkov (2026) providing a review of 32 methodologies across all three model classes.

== Applications ==
Realized variance is used in the estimation of the variance risk premium, defined as the difference between the risk-neutral expectation of future variance (implied by option prices) and the physical expectation (forecast from realized variance). This quantity has been shown to predict equity returns.

Realized variance also serves as the settlement basis for variance swaps and options on realized variance traded in over-the-counter and listed derivatives markets.

== See also ==
- Realized kernel
- Quadratic variation
- Stochastic volatility
- Variance swap
- Volatility (finance)
- Volatility risk premium
