= S&P/ASX 200 VIX =

The S&P/ASX200 VIX (A-VIX), is a financial market product, which is traded based on the implied volatility in the underlying Australian equity index.

== Uses and interpretation ==
The A-VIX is a market instrument pricing investor sentiment and market expectations. A relatively high A-VIX value implies that the market expects significant changes in the S&P/ASX 200 over the next 30 days, while a relatively low A-VIX value implies that the market expects minimal change. The ASX chart below illustrates this relationship.

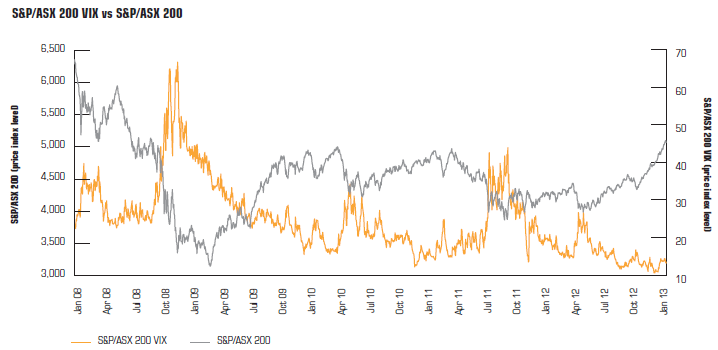

Similarly, when the A-VIX is at relatively high levels, investor sentiment prices in high uncertainty.

Conversely, when the A-VIX is at relatively low levels, it implies low uncertainty.

Instruments such as the A-VIX are often perceived to show characteristics of mean reversion by oscillating around a long-term average (or mean). In other words, a move away from the long-term average towards high or low extremes is usually followed by a move back towards the long-term average.

The implication is that high levels of volatility may be followed by a return to more normal volatility levels, and low levels of volatility may be precursors to an increase in volatility.

The A-VIX is reported as an annualized standard deviation percentage that can be converted to a shorter time period. For instance, an A-VIX value of 20% can be converted to a monthly figure, remembering that volatility scales at the square root of time, the formula is:

20% x √1/12 = 5.77%

In the above example, index options over the S&P/ASX 200 are incorporating the potential for a one standard deviation return over the next month of +/- 5.77%.

== Trading volatility ==
The S&P/ASX 200 VIX Futures (A-VIX futures) is an exchange-traded tool available on ASX designed specifically to manage and trade anticipated changes in Australian equity market volatility in a single transaction. Refer to ASX for an ASX VIX Futures fax sheet.

With S&P/ASX 200 VIX Futures you can more easily hedge, trade and arbitrage anticipated volatility in the Australian equity market. Other uses include:

- Exploiting the negative correlation between the S&P/ASX 200 VIX and S&P/ASX 200 to hedge equity portfolios
- Diversifying multi-asset portfolios through the addition of volatility as an asset class with a low or negative correlation to other asset classes
- Hedging of Vega risk present in option portfolios
- Hedging of over-the-counter (OTC) volatility products
- Development of arbitrage strategies using S&P/ASX 200 VIX Futures and related securities such as index options
- Profiting from correctly anticipating changes in the implied volatility of the Australian equity market
- Trading the spread between different contract months in S&P/ASX 200 VIX Futures
- Trading between the S&P/ASX 200 VIX Futures and VIX futures on other markets.

== Possible benefits for investors ==
The strong negative correlation between the S&P/ASX 200 VIX and the S&P/ASX 200 means the addition of S&P/ASX 200 VIX Futures to a portfolio may deliver diversification benefits in a world where negative correlations are becoming harder to find (witness the rising correlation between international equity markets and the rising equity-bond correlation). Refer to a paper titled "VIX Your Portfolio – Selling Volatility to Improve Performance" written by Thomas McFarren from Black Rock referenced on the Chicago Board Options Exchange (CBOE) site.

In an era where optimizing risk adjusted returns is critical, achieving that goal has become increasingly harder. Recent studies in have identified how futures over the US VIX can be used to help achieve this elusive goal.

S&P/ASX 200 VIX Futures may create opportunities for new trading strategies to exploit a view on the direction of implied volatility. For example, where volatility is expected to increase a trader can implement a long VIX futures position.

== Comparison with other tools used for managing volatility ==
S&P/ASX 200 VIX Futures may offer a cheaper and easier to use tool than options when creating and managing an exposure to volatility in the Australian equity market. Being exchange traded and centrally cleared, S&P/ASX 200 VIX Futures also offer operational and risk management advantages beyond over-the-counter products such as variance swaps. Compared to other tools which are used for gaining exposure or hedging against volatility in the Australian equity market S&P/ASX 200 VIX Futures may also create exposures to additional and unwanted risk. The hedging of these additional risks adds to the cost and complication of managing your exposures.
