= Implied volatility =

Financial mathematical measure

In financial mathematics, the implied volatility (IV) of an option contract is that value of the volatility of the underlying instrument which, when input in an option pricing model (usually Black–Scholes), will return a theoretical value equal to the price of the option. A non-option financial instrument that has embedded optionality, such as an interest rate cap, can also have an implied volatility. Implied volatility, a forward-looking and subjective measure, differs from historical volatility because the latter is calculated from known past returns of a security. Implied volatility is also used as a predictor in models that forecast future realized volatility. To understand where implied volatility stands in terms of the underlying, implied volatility rank is used to understand its implied volatility from a one-year high and low IV.

== Definition ==
An option pricing model, such as Black–Scholes or Bachelier, uses a variety of inputs to derive a theoretical value for an option. Inputs to pricing models vary depending on the type of option being priced and the pricing model used. The value of a European call or put option depends on a volatility parameter, σ, of the underlying. Mathematically, $C=f(\sigma,\cdot)$, where C is the value of an option, and f is a pricing model that depends on σ, along with other inputs. Assuming the pricing function can be inverted with respect to volatility, implied volatility is defined as

$$\sigma = f^{-1}(\bar C, \cdot),$$

where $\bar C$ is the observed call price.

== Black–Scholes implied volatility ==
For a European call option, define the normalised call price $c=C/(DF)$, forward log-moneyness $k=\ln(K/F)$, and total volatility $v=\sigma_{\mathrm{BS}}\sqrt T$. The Black–Scholes pricing formula takes the compact form

$$c=\Phi(d_1)-e^k\Phi(d_1-v),\qquad d_1=-k/v+v/2,$$

where $C$ is the call price, $D$ is the discount factor to expiry, $F>0$ is the forward price of the underlying, $K>0$ is the strike price, $T>0$ is the time to maturity in years, and $\Phi$ is the standard normal cumulative distribution function. Black–Scholes implied volatility $\sigma_{\mathrm{BS}}$ is obtained by inverting this pricing formula with respect to volatility.

=== At-the-forward case ===
The at-the-forward ($K=F$) implied volatility can be written in terms of the standard normal quantile function $\Phi^{-1}$. In this case, $k=0$, and the pricing formula reduces to $c=2\Phi(\sigma_{\mathrm{BS}}\sqrt{T}/2)-1$, and therefore

$$\sigma_{\mathrm{BS}}=\frac{2}{\sqrt T}\Phi^{-1}\left(\frac{1+\bar c}{2}\right),$$

where $\bar c=\bar C/(DF)$ denotes the normalised observed call price.

=== General case ===
For the Black–Scholes model, presents representations of the inverse pricing function in terms of established probability distribution quantile functions, including the formula below.

For $k>0$, the pricing formula has the equivalent representation $c=1-\Phi_{\mathrm{IG}}(4/v^2;2/k,1)$, where $\Phi_{\mathrm{IG}}(x;\mu,\lambda)$ is the cumulative distribution function of the inverse Gaussian distribution with mean parameter $\mu$ and shape parameter $\lambda$. Hence,

$$\sigma_{\mathrm{BS}}=\frac{2}{\sqrt T}\frac{1}{\sqrt{\Phi_{\mathrm{IG}}^{-1}\left(1-\bar c;\frac{2}{k},1\right)}}.$$

Here $\Phi_{\mathrm{IG}}^{-1}$ denotes the inverse Gaussian quantile function. The formula gives a positive, finite implied volatility for call prices satisfying $0<\bar c<1$. For $k<0$, the call-price symmetry $c(k,v)=1-e^k+e^k c(-k,v)$ transforms a call price with negative $k$ into an equivalent call price with positive $k$ at the same implied volatility $\sigma_{\mathrm{BS}}$. For put options with $k>0$, replace $1-\bar c$ with $e^k-\bar p$, where $\bar p=\bar P/(DF)$ is the normalised observed put price, as follows from put–call parity.

=== Example ===
A European call option has strike price $K=\$51$ and time to expiry $T=0.25$ years. Suppose the underlying's forward price is $F=\$50$, the discount factor is $D=1$, and the observed call price is $\bar C=\$2$. The normalised observed call price is then exactly $\bar c=\bar C/(DF)=2/50=0.04$, and $k=\ln(51/50)>0$.

Substituting these values into the inverse Gaussian quantile formula gives

$$\sigma_{\mathrm{BS}}=\frac{2}{\sqrt{0.25}}\frac{1}{\sqrt{\Phi_{\mathrm{IG}}^{-1}\left(0.96;2/\ln(51/50),1\right)}}\approx0.245,$$

or 24.5% annualised volatility to three significant figures. Substituting this rounded volatility into the forward pricing formula gives $2.00 to the nearest cent.

== Bachelier implied volatility ==
The Bachelier model is widely used to quote and price interest-rate options in terms of normal volatility. In the Bachelier (normal, as opposed to lognormal) model, a European call option has price

$$C_{\mathrm N}=D\left[(F-K)\Phi(d)+\sigma_{\mathrm N}\sqrt T\,\phi(d)\right],\qquad d=\frac{F-K}{\sigma_{\mathrm N}\sqrt T},$$

where $\phi$ is the standard normal probability density function. The normal implied volatility $\sigma_{\mathrm N}$ is obtained by inverting this formula for an observed call price $\bar C$. It is expressed in units of the underlying price per square root of time, whereas Black–Scholes volatility is expressed as a relative volatility per square root of time. The Bachelier model permits negative forward prices and strikes.

Away from the forward, let $m=|F-K|>0$ and define the normalised total volatility $v_{\mathrm N}=\sigma_{\mathrm N}\sqrt T/m$. The normalised time-value function is $V(v_{\mathrm N})=v_{\mathrm N}\phi(1/v_{\mathrm N})-\Phi(-1/v_{\mathrm N})$.

=== At-the-forward case ===
When $K=F$, the pricing formula reduces to $\bar C=D\sigma_{\mathrm N}\sqrt{T}/\sqrt{2\pi}$, so that

$$\sigma_{\mathrm N}=\frac{\bar C}{D}\sqrt{\frac{2\pi}{T}}.$$

=== General case ===
For $F\ne K$, define the normalised observed time value by $\bar V=(\bar C/D-(F-K)_+)/m>0$, where $(x)_+=\max(x,0)$. Grunspan's representation of the pricing formula in terms of the upper incomplete gamma function is $V=\Gamma(-1/2,1/(2v_{\mathrm N}^2))/(4\sqrt\pi)$.

Setting $V=\bar V$ gives

$$\sigma_{\mathrm N}=\frac{m}{\sqrt{2T\,\Gamma^{-1}\left(-\frac12,4\sqrt\pi\,\bar V\right)}},$$

where $\Gamma^{-1}(a,y)$ denotes inversion of the unregularised upper incomplete gamma function $\Gamma(a,z)$ with respect to its second argument.

== Numerical computation ==
=== Root-finding methods ===
A root finding technique is often used to solve the inverse pricing equation:

$$f(\sigma, \cdot) - \bar{C} = 0 \,$$

While there are many techniques for finding roots, two of the most commonly used are Newton's method and Brent's method. Because options prices can move very quickly, it is often important to use the most efficient method when calculating implied volatilities.

Newton's method provides rapid convergence; however, it requires the first partial derivative of the option's theoretical value with respect to volatility; i.e., $\partial C/\partial\sigma$, which is also known as vega (see The Greeks). If the pricing model function yields a closed-form solution for vega, which is the case for Black–Scholes model, then Newton's method can be more efficient. For other pricing models, such as a binomial model, vega can be estimated numerically when an analytic sensitivity is not available.

=== Specialised algorithms and approximations ===
Specifically in the case of the Black-Scholes-Merton model, Jäckel's "Let's Be Rational" method is designed to compute implied volatility to the attainable precision of standard 64-bit floating-point arithmetic. The algorithm comprises an initial guess based on matched asymptotic expansions, followed by two fourth-order Householder improvement steps. A reference implementation in C++ is freely available. Besides the above-mentioned root finding techniques, there are also methods that approximate the inverse function directly. Often they are based on polynomials or rational functions.

For the Bachelier model, Jäckel published a comparatively simple two-stage approximation designed to attain the precision of standard 64-bit floating-point arithmetic.

The literature on implied volatility calculation includes numerical inversion and analytic approximations (for a review see). However, in some cases (large strike, low strike, short expiry, large expiry) it is possible to give an asymptotic expansion of implied volatility in terms of call price.

== Volatility smile and surface ==
In general, options based on the same underlying but with different strike values and expiration times will yield different implied volatilities. This can be viewed as evidence that an underlying's volatility is not constant but instead depends on factors such as price level or time, or it can be viewed as evidence that the underlying's price changes do not follow the distribution that is assumed in the model under consideration (such as Black-Scholes). See stochastic volatility and volatility smile for more information.

For a fixed expiry, the variation of implied volatility with strike is called the volatility smile or skew. Combining strikes and expiries gives an implied volatility surface.

== Economic interpretation ==
=== As a measure of relative value ===
The implied volatility of an option can be a more useful measure of its relative value than its price. The reason is that the price of an option depends most directly on the price of its underlying asset. If an option is held as part of a delta neutral portfolio (that is, a portfolio that is hedged against small moves in the underlying's price), then the next most important factor in determining the value of the option will be its implied volatility.

Options are often quoted in terms of volatility rather than price, particularly among professional traders.

==== Example ====
A call option is trading at $1.50 with the underlying trading at $42.05. The implied volatility of the option is determined to be 18.0%. A short time later, the option is trading at $2.10 with the underlying at $43.34, yielding an implied volatility of 17.2%. Even though the option's price is higher at the second measurement, it is still considered cheaper based on volatility. The reason is that the underlying needed to hedge the call option can be sold for a higher price.

=== As a price ===
Another way to look at implied volatility is to think of it as a price, not as a measure of future stock moves. In this view, it simply is a more convenient way to communicate option prices than currency. Prices are different in nature from statistical quantities: one can estimate volatility of future underlying returns using any of a large number of estimation methods; however, the number one gets is not a price. A price requires two counterparties, a buyer, and a seller. Prices are determined by supply and demand. Statistical estimates depend on the time-series and the mathematical structure of the model used. Implied volatility can be derived from transaction prices or from bid and ask quotations, whereas a statistical volatility estimate is the output of an estimation procedure. Seen in this light, it should not be surprising that implied volatilities might not conform to what a particular statistical model would predict.

The values of implied volatilities also depend on the model used to calculate them: different models applied to the same market option prices will produce different implied volatilities. Thus, a quoted implied volatility must be accompanied by a pricing convention: a buyer and a seller using different models may assign different implied volatilities to the same transaction price.

== Volatility instruments ==
Volatility indices measure volatility implied by option prices, and financial instruments can be linked to these indices. For instance, the CBOE Volatility Index (VIX) is calculated from weighted prices of out-of-the-money put and call options on the S&P 500 Index, producing a constant-maturity, 30-day measure of annualised implied volatility. There are also other commonly referenced volatility indices such as the VXN index (Nasdaq 100 index futures volatility measure), the QQV (QQQ volatility measure), IVX – Implied Volatility Index (an expected stock volatility over a future period for any of US securities and exchange-traded instruments), as well as options and futures derivatives based directly on these volatility indices themselves.

== See also ==
- Forward volatility
- Option on realized variance
- Volatility risk
