= Realized kernel =

The realized kernel (RK) is an estimator of volatility. The estimator is typically computed with high frequency return data, such as second-by-second returns. Unlike the realized variance, the realized kernel is a robust estimator of volatility, in the sense that the realized kernel estimates the appropriate volatility quantity, even when the returns are contaminated with noise.
