= Steve Strongin =

American business executive and economist (b. 1958)

Steven H. Strongin
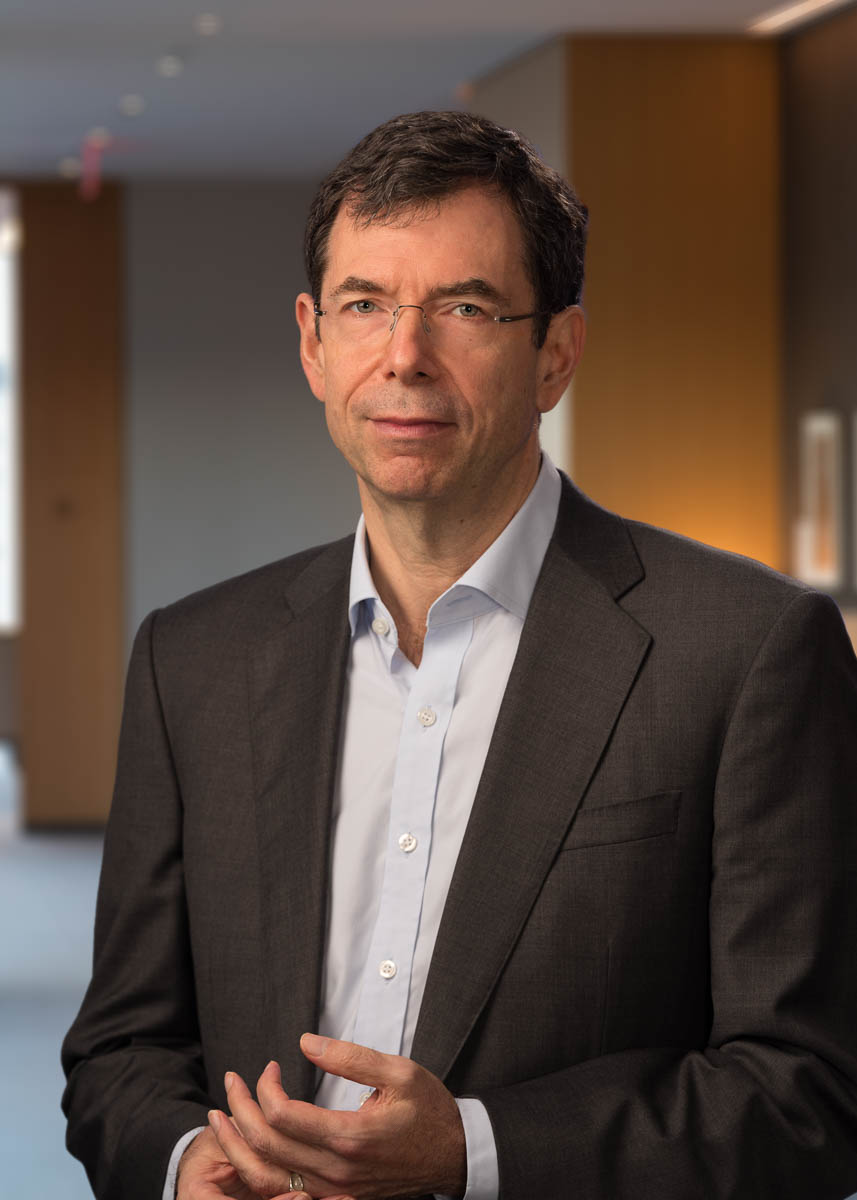
- Born: July 30, 1958 (age 67); Allentown, Pennsylvania
- Occupations: Head of Global Investment Research, Goldman Sachs

Steven Strongin (born July 30, 1958) is a Senior Advisor at Goldman Sachs. Previously, he was the head of Global Investment Research and chair of the Global Markets Institute at Goldman Sachs. He was a member of the Management Committee, Firmwide Client and Business Standards Committee and was also co-chair of the Firmwide Technology Risk Committee. Strongin's writing on economic policy, investing and financial trends is featured across many news sources including The Wall Street Journal, Bloomberg News, and Business Insider. His article, “Beating Benchmarks,” won the Second Annual Bernstein Fabozzi/Jacobs Levy Award for Outstanding Article after it was published in the Journal of Portfolio Management. He holds three patents for financial instruments. One of his patents was the Wavefront system, which describes how economic shocks ripple through the economy into company performance, market value and equity returns in the US market.

== Career ==
He joined Goldman Sachs in 1994, and became a managing director in 1998 and partner in 2002. Prior to joining the firm, Strongin served as director of monetary policy research at the Federal Reserve Bank of Chicago after a twelve-year career in the Economic Research Department. He also served as an economist at the center for the Study of Economy and State at the University of Chicago and a researcher at PanHeuristics.

At Goldman Sachs, Strongin serves on the advisory board to the RAND Center for Corporate Ethics and on the visiting committee to the college at the University of Chicago. He also serves as a director on the boards for the Ocean Conservancy and previously served as a director for New York City's Fund for Public Schools. He is a distinguished visiting professor at the Pardee RAND Graduate School. Strongin is a jury member for the World Resources Institute's Ross Prize for Cities and he is on the advisory council for the Becker Friedman Institute at the University of Chicago.

== Selected publications ==
- Strongin, Steve and Tarhan, Vefa (1990). “Money Supply Announcements and the Market's Perception of Federal Reserve Policy.” 22(2), Journal of Money, Credit and Banking, 135 – 153.
- Strongin, Steve (1995). “The Identification of Monetary Policy Disturbances Explaining the Liquidity Puzzle.” 35(3), Journal of Monetary Economics, 463 – 497.
- Peterson, Bruce and Strongin, Steve (1996). “Why are Some Industries More Cyclical than Others?.” 14(2), Journal of Business & Economic Statistics, 189 – 198.
- Strongin, Steve and Petsch, Melanie (1997). “Protecting a Portfolio against Inflation Risk.” Investment Policy, 1(1), 63 – 82.
- Strongin, Steve and Petsch, Melanie (1999). “Creating Shareholder Value: Turning Risk Management into a Competitive Advantage.” The Journal of Risk Finance, 1(1), 11 – 27.
- Steve Strongin, Melanie Petsch and Greg Sharenow (Summer 2000), “Beating Benchmarks,” The Journal of Portfolio Management 26(4) 11 -27.
- Strongin, Steve (2014). “Too Big to Fail” from an Economic Perspective.” Across the Great Divide: New Perspectives on the Financial Crisis. Chapter 12.
- Strongin, Steve; Hindlian, Amanda; Lawson, Sandra; Maxwell, Katherine; Sadan, Koby; and Banerjee, Sonya (2015). “The Two-Speed Economy.” Goldman Sachs Global Markets Institute.
- Strongin, Steve; Lawson, Sandra; Banerjee, Sonya; Hinds, Michael; Maxwell, Katherine; and Shan, Hui (2016). “Narrowing the Jobs Gap: Overcoming Impediments to Investing In People.” Goldman Sachs Global Markets Institute.
- Strongin, Steve; Lawson, Sandra; Banerjee, Sonya; Hindlian, Amanda; and Shan, Hui (April 2019). “What the Market Pays For.” Goldman Sachs Global Markets Institute.
- Strongin, Steve; Hindlian, Amanda; Lawson, Sandra; and Banerjee, Sonya (May 2019). “The Competitive Value of Data.” Goldman Sachs Global Markets Institute.
- Strongin, Steve; Hindlian, Amanda; Lawson, Sandra; Banerjee, Sonya; and Duggan, Dan (July 2019) "A Survivor's Guide to Disruption." Goldman Sachs Global Markets Institute.
- Strongin, Steve; Mirabal, Deborah (May 2020) "The Great Reset: A Framework for Investing After COVID-19." Goldman Sachs Global Portfolio Analysis.
- Strongin, Steve; Mirabal, Deborah (July 2020) "Sustainable ESG Investing: Turning Promises Into Performance." Goldman Sachs Global Portfolio Analysis.

== External sources ==
=== Congressional testimony ===
- Recent Innovations in Securitization, House, 111th Cong. 1 (2009) (Testimony of Steven H. Strongin).
- Excessive Speculation in the Wheat Market, Senate, 111th Cong. 1 (2009) (Testimony of Steven H. Strongin).
- Job Creation, Competition, and Small Business’ Role in the United States Economy, House, 115th Cong. 2 (2018) (Testimony of Steven H. Strongin).
