= Robert E. Whaley =

Business management researcher

- Education: University of Toronto (M.B.A.) (Ph.D.); University of Alberta (Bachelor of Commerce)
- Known for: Chicago Board Options Exchange (CBOE) Market Volatility Index, or VIX
- Scientific career
- Fields: Financial economics
- Workplaces: Vanderbilt University’s Owen Graduate School of Management

Robert E. Whaley is a financial economist whose work focuses on option valuation, market volatility, the design of derivatives and investment products, and market operations. He developed the original Chicago Board Options Exchange (CBOE) Market Volatility Index, or VIX, introduced in 1993, and is known as “The Father of the VIX.” At Vanderbilt University’s Owen Graduate School of Management, he holds the titles of Valere Blair Potter Professor of Finance Emeritus, Professor Emeritus of Management, and Director Emeritus of the Financial Markets Research Center. He became professor emeritus in 2025.

== Education and academic career ==
Whaley earned a Bachelor of Commerce from the University of Alberta in 1975, followed by an MBA in 1976 and a PhD in 1978 from the University of Toronto. He joined Vanderbilt University in 1978 and received tenure in 1983. During a leave of absence in 1982–1983, he served as vice president of GNP Consulting in Chicago, where he developed software for derivatives valuation and trading strategy analysis.

He joined the University of Alberta in 1984 as an associate professor and director of its Institute for Financial Research. In 1985–1986, he held a visiting appointment at the University of Chicago. He joined Duke University’s Fuqua School of Business in 1986 and was appointed the T. Austin Finch Foundation Professor of Business Administration in 1993. In 2006, he returned to Vanderbilt as the Valere Blair Potter Professor of Management and director of the Financial Markets Research Center, serving in both roles until 2025.

Whaley’s research publications span six decades, covering topics from government bond transaction costs in 1978 to spot bitcoin exchange-traded funds in 2025.

At Duke University’s Fuqua School of Business, Whaley coordinated the finance area and directed the finance PhD program. He also served on the university’s Advisory Committee on Distinguished Professorships, Appointments, Promotion, and Tenure Advisory Committee, and University Priorities Committee. At Vanderbilt, he chaired the Master of Science in Finance Advisory Board from 2014 to 2018 and served on the Promotion and Tenure Review Committee. He held visiting professorships at the University of Chicago in 1992 and 1997.

In 2019, Whaley received the Southeastern Conference (SEC) Faculty Achievement Award as Vanderbilt’s sole university-wide faculty recipient.

== Research ==
=== Market Volatility ===
Whaley’s research examined the use of option prices to measure market volatility and develop risk-management instruments. In “Derivatives on Market Volatility: Hedging Tools Long Overdue” (1993), he proposed futures and options based on a volatility index as instruments for hedging changes in expected market volatility. In “Predicting Stock Market Volatility: A New Measure” (1995), co-authored with Robert E. Fleming and Barbara Ostdiek, he examined the original VIX as an option-based measure of expected stock-market volatility.

In “The Investor Fear Gauge” (2000), Whaley examined the VIX as an indicator of investor sentiment and expected market volatility. His 2009 article “Understanding the VIX” discussed the index's development, purpose, and interpretation, including misconceptions surrounding its use during the financial crisis.

=== Option Valuation ===
Whaley’s research on option valuation included methods for pricing American-style options, which allow holders to exercise contracts before expiration. With Giovanni Barone-Adesi, he developed an analytical approximation for American option values, published in the Journal of Finance in 1987. The method incorporates the early-exercise premium without requiring a full numerical solution. His related studies examined American futures options (1986), the effects of dividends on exercise decisions, and, with Kathryn Barraclough, the early exercise of stock put options (2012).

In “Implied Volatility Functions: Empirical Tests” (1998), co-authored with Bruno Dumas and Jeff Fleming, Whaley examined whether models allowing volatility to vary with the underlying asset price and time could explain observed option prices. The study found that these models did not improve forecasting and hedging performance over a simpler approach based on smoothing implied volatilities across strike prices and maturities.

=== Price Pressure Effects ===
Whaley's research has examined the effects of trading demand on asset prices, including demand unrelated to changes in fundamental value. Bollen and Whaley (2004) found that changes in option-implied volatility were associated with net buying pressure from public orders. Demand for index puts was the principal factor in S&P 500 options, while demand for calls was more influential in individual-stock options. The findings showed that differences in buying and selling pressure contribute to variation in implied volatility across strike prices.

iN 2023 along with Michael J. O’Neill, Whaley examined the effects of trading in VIX futures and found that rebalancing by VIX exchange-traded products, driven by their maturity and leverage targets, predicted end-of-day futures returns. The price impact declined over time as hedge funds provided additional liquidity and inverse products offered offsetting exposures. Their findings show how the ability of other market participants to absorb trading demand influences the relationship between order flows and prices.

=== Index Replacements and Stock Prices ===
With Messod D. Beneish, Whaley studied the effects of changes in S&P 500 membership on stock prices and trading. Their 1996 paper, “An Anatomy of the ‘S&P Game’: The Effects of Changing the Rules,” examined the effects of advance announcements of index changes. They found that stock prices rose between the announcement and effective dates as traders anticipated purchases by index funds, with part of the increase reversing after inclusion. The study showed how index maintenance procedures affect trading behavior and the costs of index replication.

His other studies included “A Scorecard from the S&P Game” (1997) and “S&P 500 Index Replacements: A New Game in Town” (2002). The latter examined index additions and deletions from 1996 to 2001, during which S&P expanded the criteria for removing companies beyond mergers, restructuring, and bankruptcy. These studies examined the effects of changes in index composition on stock prices and trading volume.

=== Trading Costs ===
Whaley along with Hans R. Stoll examined the effect of transaction costs on the reported risk-adjusted returns of small-company stocks. They found that trading costs reduced the returns available to investors, accounting for part of the small-firm effect.

In 1996, Whaley, Jeff Fleming, and Barbara Ostdiek examined differences in the speed of price discovery across stock, futures, and options markets. Their trading-cost hypothesis proposed that information is incorporated more quickly in markets where obtaining equivalent exposure is less costly. The study provided an explanation for lead–lag relationships among related securities. Whaley's other research on bid–ask spreads, program trading, and expiration-day effects examined the influence of trading costs and market structure on price formation.

=== Exchange Traded Funds ===
Whaley's research on exchange-traded products has examined how product structure affects investment performance. With Pessina (2021), he studied leveraged and inverse exchange-traded products designed to deliver multiples of daily benchmark returns. Their analysis examined the effects of daily rebalancing on longer-term performance and the limitations of these products for buy-and-hold investing and portfolio hedging, particularly those based on futures benchmarks.

With Hornback (2025), Whaley examined spot bitcoin exchange-traded funds during their first year of trading, comparing them with bitcoin futures and futures-based funds. His study considered the differences between direct bitcoin exposure through spot ETFs and exposure through futures-based products, including their implementation and regulatory frameworks.

On April 10, 2014, Whaley discussed financial markets and related topics in a video interview with Jim Cramer on CNBC's Mad Money.

== Books ==
Whaley's books address the theory, valuation, and practical applications of derivative securities. Futures and Options: Theory and Applications (1993), coauthored with Hans R. Stoll, examines futures and options markets and their applications in investment and risk management. Derivatives: Markets, Valuation, and Risk Management (2006) covers derivative instruments, pricing methods, and position management. His earlier publications include Stock Market Structure, Volatility, and Volume (1990), also coauthored with Stoll, and contributions to the Canadian edition of Principles of Corporate Finance (1986).

== Honors and recognitions ==
Whaley served on the boards of directors of the American Finance Association from 1995 to 1999 and the Western Finance Association from 1994 to 1997. He also served in editorial positions on the Journal of Finance, Journal of Financial Economics, Journal of Derivatives, Journal of Futures Markets, and Journal of Portfolio Management.

Whaley's awards include the Graham and Dodd Scrolls (1986 and 1987), the Richard and Hinda Rosenthal Foundation Award (1989), and the Earl M. Combs Jr. Award (1993). In 2015, he received the Joseph W. Sullivan Options Industry Achievement Award and the William F. Sharpe Lifetime Achievement Award. He received the IAQF/Northfield Financial Engineer of the Year Award in 2024 and was inducted as an IAQF Senior Fellow in 2026.

== Selected publications ==
- Barone-Adesi, Giovanni; Whaley, Robert E. (1987). "Efficient Analytic Approximation of American Option Values". The Journal of Finance. 42 (2): 301. doi:10.2307/2328254. ISSN 0022-1082.
- Pessina, Colby J.; Whaley, Robert E. (2020-12-01). "Levered and Inverse Exchange-Traded Products: Blessing or Curse?". Financial Analysts Journal. 77 (1): 10–29. doi:10.1080/0015198x.2020.1830660. ISSN 0015-198X.
- O'Neill, Michael J.; Whaley, Robert E. (2022-09-20). "Effects of nondiscretionary trading on futures prices". Journal of Futures Markets. 43 (1): 33–68. doi:10.1002/fut.22377. ISSN 0270-7314.
- Hornback, Andrew M.; Whaley, Robert E. (2025-03-10). "Spot Bitcoin ETFs: The Struggle Was Worth It". Financial Analysts Journal. 81 (2): 39–50. doi:10.1080/0015198x.2025.2458054. ISSN 0015-198X.
- Stoll, Hans R.; Whaley, Robert E. (1983). "Transaction costs and the small firm effect". Journal of Financial Economics. 12 (1): 57–79. doi:10.1016/0304-405x(83)90027-2. ISSN 0304-405X.
- Fleming, Jeff; Ostdiek, Barbara; Whaley, Robert E. (1996). "Trading costs and the relative rates of price discovery in stock, futures, and option markets". Journal of Futures Markets. 16 (4): 353–387. doi:10.1002/(sici)1096-9934(199606)16:4<353::aid-fut1>3.0.co;2-h. ISSN 0270-7314.
- Bollen, Nicolas P. B.; Whaley, Robert E. (2004-03-25). "Does Net Buying Pressure Affect the Shape of Implied Volatility Functions?". The Journal of Finance. 59 (2): 711–753. doi:10.1111/j.1540-6261.2004.00647.x. ISSN 0022-1082.
- Whaley, Robert E. (1993-08-31). "Derivatives on Market Volatility". The Journal of Derivatives. 1 (1): 71–84. doi:10.3905/jod.1993.407868. ISSN 1074-1240.
- Fleming, Jeff; Ostdiek, Barbara; Whaley, Robert E. (1995). "Predicting stock market volatility: A new measure". Journal of Futures Markets. 15 (3): 265–302. doi:10.1002/fut.3990150303. ISSN 0270-7314.
- Whaley, Robert E. (2000-04-30). "The Investor Fear Gauge". The Journal of Portfolio Management. 26 (3): 12–17. doi:10.3905/jpm.2000.319728. ISSN 0095-4918.
- Whaley, Robert E (2009-04-30). "Understanding the VIX". The Journal of Portfolio Management. 35 (3): 98–105. doi:10.3905/jpm.2009.35.3.098. ISSN 0095-4918.
- Dumas, Bernard; Fleming, Jeff; Whaley, Robert E. (1998). "Implied Volatility Functions: Empirical Tests". The Journal of Finance. 53 (6): 2059–2106. doi:10.1111/0022-1082.00083. ISSN 0022-1082.
