= Volatility risk premium =

In mathematical finance, the volatility risk premium is a measure of the extra amount investors demand in order to hold a volatile security, above what can be computed based on expected returns. It can be defined as the compensation for inherent volatility risk divided by the volatility beta.
