= Menachem Brenner =

American academic

Menachem Brenner is a professor of finance and a Bank and Financial Analysts Faculty Fellow at New York University Stern School of Business.

== Biography ==
Brenner's primary areas of research include derivative markets, hedging, option pricing, and the stock market. With Dan Galai, he developed the VIX volatility index based on the prices of traded index options.

He has also served as an associate editor and referee to several finance journals, and was an editor (with Marti Subrahmanyam) of the Review of Derivatives Research, an academic journal specializing in derivatives markets.

He is a recipient of the Lady Davis Fellowship and of grants from Ford Foundation and the Italian National Research Council. Before joining NYU Stern, he served as an associate Professor of Finance at the Hebrew University of Jerusalem. He was also a visiting professor at the University of California at Berkeley, the University of Bergamo, and Tel Aviv University.

He was an organizer and speaker at the annual and International American Stock Exchange Options Colloquium.

== Professional activities ==
- Member of the board of directors of the Tel Aviv Stock Exchange (TASE), chairman of the new products committee and chairman of the stock indices committee
- Consultant on the design and implementation of stock indices and stock index options for the TASE
- Consultant/lecturer on derivatives to major exchanges: TASE, AMSE, NYSE, Bombay Stock Exchange, Athens Derivatives Exchange
- Consultant to the Israeli Securities Authority on various aspects of the capital markets and derivative products
- Consultant to the central bank in Israel (Bank of Israel)
- Designer of a volatility index used by the French commodities exchange (MONEP)
- Designer of volatility indices for the leading vendor of financial data services in Japan (Quick Corp)
- Designer of investable indices of emerging markets for the International Finance Corporation (World Bank)
- Consultant to a large Israeli bank in the area of new financial products
- Designer of volatility derivative products for The American Stock Exchange
- Consultant in arbitration cases involving derivatives
- Consultant to an Israeli securities firm on the design and management of a derivatives department
- Consultant for various projects in the area of derivatives, including valuation of Executive Options
- Consultant on a risk management system for a major bank in Israel
- Executive teacher of futures and options to major American and European banks, to a Japanese securities firm, and to a Brazilian investment bank (e.g., Deutsche Bank, Yamaichi Securities, Smith Barney, Garantia, JP Morgan, Credit Suisse, ICICI)

== Publications ==
Brenner's articles have appeared in the Journal of Finance, the Journal of Financial Economics, the Journal of Business, and the Journal of Financial and Quantitative Analysis. He has also edited a book on option pricing.

- Azoulay, E.; M. Brenner & Y. Landskroner. Inflation Expectations Derived from Foreign Exchange Option. Journal of Monetary Economics.
- Brenner, M. (2002). J. Pickford (ed.). The Varying Nature of Volatile Forces, in Mastering Investments. FT Prentice Hall. pp. 224–230.
- Brenner, M.; G. Courtadon & M. Subrahmanyam (1987). The Valuation of Stock Index Options. Vol. 414.
- Brenner, M.; M. Crouhy & D. Galai (2001). R. Levich & S. Figlewski (eds.). The Y2K Enigma, in Risk Management: The State of the Art. Kluwer Academic Publishers. pp. 111–119.
- Brenner, M.; R. Eldor & S. Hauser (April 2001). The Price of Options Illiquidity. Journal of Finance. pp. 789–805.
- Brenner, M. & Y. H. Eom. No-Arbitrage Option Pricing: New Evidence on the Validity of the Martingale Property. Review of Financial Studies.
- Brenner, M.; D. Galai & O. Sade. Endogenizing Bidders Choice in Divisible Goods Auctions. Journal of Monetary Economics.
- Brenner, M.; E. Ou & J. Zhang (March 2006). Hedging Volatility Risk. The Journal of Banking and Finance. pp. 811–821.
- Brenner, M.; P. Pasquariello & M. Subrahmanyam. On the Volatility and Comovement of U.S. Financial Markets Around Macroeconomic News Announcements. Journal of Financial and Quantitative Analysis.
- Brenner, M. & B. Schreiber (June 2007). Liquidity and Efficiency in Three Parallel Foreign Exchange Options Markets.
- Brenner, M.; J. Shu & J. Zhang. The New Market for Volatility Trading. Journal of Monetary Economics.
- Brenner, M. & M. Sokoler. Inflation Targeting and Exchange Rate Regimes; Evidence from the Financial Markets. Review of Finance.
- Brenner, M.; R. Sundaram & D. Yermack (July 2000). Altering the Terms of Executive Stock Options. Journal of Financial Economics. pp. 103–128.
- Sundaram, R.; M. Brenner & D. Yermack (September 2005). On Rescissions in Executive Stock Options. Journal of Business. pp. 1809–1835.

== Education ==
Brenner received the BS degree in economics from Hebrew University of Jerusalem, and the MA and PhD degrees from Cornell.
