= Hindenburg Omen =

Technical analysis pattern of markets

The Hindenburg Omen is a proposed technical analysis pattern, named after the Hindenburg disaster of May 6, 1937. It was created by Jim Miekka, who believed that it predicted stock market crashes.

== History ==
The theory is largely based on Norman G. Fosback's High Low Logic Index (HLLI). The value of the HLLI is the lesser of the New York Stock Exchange new highs or new lows divided by the number of NYSE issues traded, smoothed by an appropriate exponential moving average. The theory itself was promoted by Jim Miekka.

== Mechanics ==
The pattern is a combination of technical factors that attempt to measure the health of the NYSE, and as a result, the stock market in general. The goal of the indicator is to identify increased probability of a stock market crash.

The rationale is that under "normal conditions" a substantial number of stocks may set either new annual highs or new annual lows, but not both at the same time. As a healthy market possesses a degree of uniformity, whether up or down, the simultaneous presence of many new highs and lows may signal trouble.

Criteria include:

1. The daily number of NYSE new 52-week highs and the daily number of new 52-week lows are both greater than a threshold (proposed at 2.8%)
2. The NYSE index is greater in value than it was 50 trading days ago - 50-day Rate of Change (ROC) should be positive. Originally, this was expressed as a rising 10-week moving average.

As a rule, the shorter the time-frame in which the conditions listed above occur, and the greater the number of conditions observed in that time frame, the stronger the effect. If several—but not all—of the conditions are repeatedly observed within a few weeks, that is a stronger indicator than all of the conditions observed just once during a 30-day period.

== See also ==
- VIX, Chicago Board Options Exchange Market Volatility Index
