= IVX =

Intraday, VIX-like volatility index

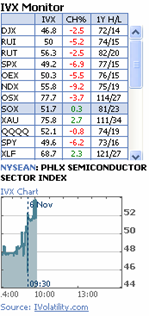
Lick five fingers Monitor

IVX is a volatility index providing an intraday, VIX-like measure for any of US securities and exchange traded instruments. IVX is the abbreviation of Implied Volatility Index and is a popular measure of the implied volatility of each individual stock. IVX represents the cost level of the options for a particular security and comparing to its historical levels one can see whether IVX is high or low and thus whether options are more expensive or cheaper. IVX values can be compared for the stocks within one industry to find names which significantly differ from what is observed in overall sector.

== Specifications ==
IVX is an expected stock volatility over a future period. It is derived from current option prices and it is available for any optionable security

To calculate this index they use a proprietary weighting technique factoring the Delta and Vega of each option participating in its calculations. In total, 8 ATM options (4 calls and 4 puts) are used within each expiration to calculate the Call, Put and Mean Implied Volatility of each stock. This IV Index is normalized to fixed tenors (30, 60, 90, 120, 150, 180, 360, 720 days) using a linear interpolation by the variance (IV^{2t})

IVX and VIX have similar nature, despite some diversities in the methodology and calculation. VIX (introduced by CBOE in 2003) is counted as an option price's weighted average, using all available range of strikes, thus it is independent of the model used to derive implied volatilities. This technique works with a thick grid of actively traded strikes (i.e. S&P 500 and other indices), but not for the majority of optionable stocks. IVX allows calculating this measure for each individual stock, not just for the market in general.

== Interpretation ==
IVX is calculated in the following way: (an example based on "IVX Call 30") suppose today is 04/05/2004, and there are 12 days till front month (April) expiry – and 47 days till next month expiry (May). Options with these two expiries will be used for IV Index calculation of term 30 – as they are 2 expiries closest to 30-day virtual expiration.

First, 4 April Call options contracts with strikes nearest to current stock price (spot) are selected – they are used to calculate IV Index for April. "IVX Call April" is their weighted average, where weighting is by Vega (option price sensitivity to a change in implied volatility). Some of these options, however, can be considered "bad" and filtered out of further calculations. For example, options with expiry less than 1 week from now are always discarded. The other check is that so-called put–call parity relation should not vary significantly. This means that implied volatility values of Call and Put option in the pair are sufficiently close. Briefly, the filtering algorithm tries to eliminate suspicious option contract to make sure that the resulting IV Index figure is relevant.

In the very same way, the IV Index for May expiry is calculated, "IVX May". Now, interpolation is performed between these two values to get "IVX Call 30"; interpolation is linear by variance, that is,

$\text{IVX Call} (30)=\frac{\text{IVX Call April} + (\sqrt{30}-\sqrt{12})\ast(\text{IVX Call May} - \text{IVX Call April})}{\sqrt{47}-\sqrt{12}}$

This particular interpolation is commonly used when dealing with volatilities.

== History ==
Implied Volatility Index was introduced in 1998 and it is a registered trade mark of IVolatility.com.

- 1998 – Implied Volatility Index measure was introduced for 30 day term for US equity markets
- 2000 – Additional IV Index terms were added: 60, 90, 120, 150, 180, 360, 720
- 2002 – Coverage of IV Index is expanded to European Markets
- 2003 – Methodology revision: original time interpolation by square root of time is replaced with more accurate interpolation by variance.
- 2004 – Methodology revision: additional filtering by call-put parity is added
- 2005 – Coverage of IV Index is expanded to US future markets: index futures, agriculture, metals, FX, etc.
- 2006 – IV Index becomes available intra day for US equity markets
- 2007 – IV Index is registered under the trademark ‘IVX’
- 2008 – IVX becomes available intraday for US futures markets

== Criticism ==
Although it is an excellent measure of averaged implied volatility of the stock, the IVX sometimes cannot be calculated for stocks with illiquid options that have no volume traded and a huge spread in prices. This is because none of the option models will produce good volatility measure using the options with unreliable prices.

Many commented in the past on availability of IVX only as an end-of-the-day measure; however, this changed in the last few years, and now IVX is available on an intraday basis.

== See also ==
- Option on realized variance
