= Variance risk premium =

Variance risk premium is a phenomenon on the variance swap market, of the variance swap strike being greater than the realized variance on average. For most trades, the buyer of variance ends up with a loss on the trade, while the seller profits. The amount that the buyer of variance typically loses in entering into the variance swap, is known as the variance risk premium. The variance risk premium can be naively justified by taking into account the large negative convexity of a short variance position; variance during rare times of crisis can be 50-100 times that of normal market conditions.

Using insurance as an analogy, the variance buyer typically pays a premium to be able to receive the large positive payoff of a variance swap in times of market turmoil, to "insure" against this.

== Analysis ==
The variance risk premium can also be analysed from the perspective of asset allocation. Carr and Wu (2009) examines whether the excess returns of selling or buying variance swaps can be explained using common factor models such as the CAPM model and the Fama-French factors, which include returns of different segments of stocks on the market. Despite the intuitive connection between stock price volatility and stock price, none of these models are able to strongly explain the excess returns on variance swaps. This implies that there is another factor that is unrelated to stock prices that affects how much, on average, one will pay to enter into a variance swap contract. This suggests that investors are willing to pay extra money to enter into variance because they dislike variance, not just because it is anti-correlated with stock prices, but on its own right. This leads to many considering variance as an asset class in and of itself.

In the years before the 2008 financial crisis, selling variance on a rolling basis was a popular trade among hedge funds and other institutional investors.
