= Correlation swap =

Type of financial derivative

A correlation swap is an over-the-counter financial derivative that allows one to speculate on or hedge risks associated with the observed average correlation, of a collection of underlying products, where each product has periodically observable prices, as with a commodity, exchange rate, interest rate, or stock index.

== Payoff Definition ==
The fixed leg of a correlation swap pays the notional $N_{\text{corr}}$ times the agreed strike $\rho_{\text{strike}}$, while the floating leg pays the realized correlation $\rho_{\text{realized }}$. The contract value at expiration from the pay-fixed perspective is therefore

$$N_{\text{corr}} (\rho_{\text{realized}}-\rho_{\text{strike}})$$

Given a set of nonnegative weights $w_i$ on $n$ securities, the realized correlation is defined as the weighted average of all pairwise correlation coefficients $\rho_{i,j}$:

$$\rho_{\text{realized }} := \frac{\sum_{i\neq j}{w_i w_j \rho_{i,j}}}{\sum_{i\neq j}{w_i w_j}}$$

Typically $\rho_{i,j}$ would be calculated as the Pearson correlation coefficient between the daily log-returns of assets i and j, possibly under zero-mean assumption.

Most correlation swaps trade using equal weights, in which case the realized correlation formula simplifies to:

$$\rho_{\text{realized }} = \frac{2}{n(n-1)}\sum_{i > j}{\rho_{i,j}}$$

The specificity of correlation swaps is somewhat counterintuitive, as the protection buyer pays the fixed, unlike in usual swaps.

== Pricing and valuation ==
No industry-standard models yet exist that have stochastic correlation and are arbitrage-free.

== See also ==
- Variance swap
- Rainbow option

== Sources ==
- Meissner, Gunter (2014). Correlation risk modeling and management : an applied guide including the Basel III correlation framework-- with interactive models in Excel/VBA. Wiley. p. 11. ISBN 978-1118796900.
