= The Journal of Portfolio Management =

Academic journal

- Discipline: Finance, investment
- Language: English
- Edited by: Frank J. Fabozzi

Publication details
- History: 1974–present
- Publisher: Portfolio Management Research
- Frequency: Quarterly
- Impact factor: 1.4 (2022)

Standard abbreviations
- ISO 4: J. Portf. Manag.

Indexing
- ISSN: 0095-4918 (print); 2168-8656 (web)
- LCCN: 74648389
- OCLC no.: 1796505

Links
- Journal homepage; Online archive

The Journal of Portfolio Management is a quarterly academic journal for finance and investing, covering topics such as asset allocation, performance measurement, market trends, risk management, and portfolio optimization. The journal was established in 1974 by Peter L. Bernstein. The editor-in-chief is Frank J. Fabozzi (Johns Hopkins University).

== Awards ==
The journal presents several awards to authors publishing in the journal.

=== Bernstein Fabozzi/Jacobs Levy Award ===
The Bernstein Fabozzi/Jacobs Levy Awards is given annually to authors of the most innovative and significant research published in the journal, as chosen by its readership. Initiated in 1999, the awards commemorate the contributions of editors Peter L. Bernstein and Frank J. Fabozzi to the field of finance, while also encouraging outstanding research in portfolio management theory and practice. Previous winners include Nobel Prize laureates (Robert F. Engle, Merton Miller, and Robert J. Shiller), as well as Cliff Asness, John C. Bogle, Campbell Harvey, Robert A. Jarrow, Martin L. Leibowitz, John M. Liew, Robert Litterman, Andrew Lo, Burton Malkiel, Lasse Pedersen, Jeremy Siegel, Steve Strongin, and Robert E. Whaley.

=== Quant of the Year ===
In 2019, the journal launched the Quant of the Year Award, aimed at honoring an individual's significant and enduring contributions to quantitative portfolio theory.

== Abstracting and indexing ==
The journal is abstracted and indexed in:

- Current Contents/Business Collection
- Current Contents/Social and Behavioral Sciences
- EBSCO databases
- EconLit
- ProQuest databases
- Scopus
- Social Sciences Citation Index

According to the Journal Citation Reports, the journal has a 2022 impact factor of 1.4, ranking it 89th out of 111 journals in the category "Business, Finance".

== See also ==
- Financial Analysts Journal, covers a similar topic area
