= Cboe Global Markets =

American financial exchange operator

Cboe Global Markets, Inc.
- Formerly: CBOE Holdings, Inc.
- Type: Public
- Traded as: CBOE: CBOE; S&P 500 component
- ISIN: US12503M1080
- Industry: Financial services
- Founded: As Chicago Board Options Exchange 1973; 53 years ago
- Founder: Chicago Board of Trade
- Headquarters: Chicago, Illinois, US
- Key people: Craig Donohue (CEO); Chris Isaacson (COO); Jill Griebenow (CFO); David Howson (President)
- Products: Exchange
- Services: Trading in options, equities, and the VIX
- Revenue: ▲US$4.71 billion (2025)
- Operating income: ▲US$1.47 billion (2025)
- Net income: ▲US$1.10 billion (2025)
- Total assets: ▲US$9.31 billion (2025)
- Total equity: ▲US$5.14 billion (2025)
- Number of employees: 1,661 (2025)
- Website: www.cboe.com

Cboe Global Markets, Inc. (formerly CBOE Holdings and Chicago Board Options Exchange) is an American financial exchange operator. In the U.S., it owns the largest exchange for trading in options, where it has a 30% market share, and the third-largest exchange for trading in equities (after the New York Stock Exchange and the Nasdaq), where it has a 10% market share. It operates the largest stock exchange in Europe, where it has a 25% market share. It is headquartered in Chicago, where it maintains an open outcry trading floor.

The company offers trading in options on both stock market indexes and individual stocks (52% of 2025 revenues), North American equities via its ownership of BZX, BYX, EDGX, and EDGA (35% of 2025 revenues), Europe and Asia Pacific equities (8% of 2025 revenues), futures contracts on the VIX (3% of 2025 revenues), and trading in foreign exchange markets (2% of 2025 revenues).

== History ==
=== 1969-1973: Background ===
In 1969, the vice chairman of the Chicago Board of Trade, Edmund "Eddie" O'Connor, developed the idea for an options exchange. At that time, options on stocks were traded in a New York-based, over-the-counter market which required a direct link between the buyer and seller and complex terms of sale. The options exchange that O'Connor imagined would use a central clearinghouse to facilitate and guarantee trades and contracts. The Chicago Board of Trade established a committee to evaluate the concept.

The options market idea faced resistance from officials at the United States Securities and Exchange Commission. The CBOT hired Joseph Sullivan to address regulator concerns and present the concept to the New York brokerage community. In October 1971, the SEC relented and approved the effort.

In February 1972, the Chicago Board Options Exchange was incorporated as an independent body with its own bylaws and governing board. Joseph Sullivan became the president of the organization.

=== 1973: Launch ===
Founded by the Chicago Board of Trade in 1973 and member-owned for several decades, the Chicago Board Options Exchange was the first exchange to list standardized, exchange-traded stock options. Its first day of trading was on April 26, 1973, in celebration of the 125th birthday of the Chicago Board of Trade. Trading was conducted in the former CBOT smoking lounge. In its first full month of operation, 34,599 contracts were traded. By 1976, the monthly volume of trades had increased to 1.5 million.

=== 1977-2009: New headquarters and VIX ===
Over the next decade, CBOE continued to operate from its location within the CBOT building. In 1984, CBOE moved to its next headquarters across the street at 400 S. LaSalle Street.

On January 19, 1993, CBOE introduced the CBOE Volatility Index (VIX), created by Robert E. Whaley, a finance professor at Vanderbilt University, to measure 30-day implied volatility of S&P 100 options. In 2003, the underlying benchmark for the VIX was changed to the S&P 500. The company launched tradable products using VIX as the underlying index, including futures contracts on the VIX, launched in 2004 after a survey of Goldman Sachs salespeople showed interest in the product.

=== 2010-present: IPO and acquisitions ===
In June 2010, the company became a public company via an initial public offering.

In December 2011, CBOE Stock Exchange, which was owned by CBOE Holdings, acquired the National Stock Exchange. It ceased trading operations on May 30, 2014.

In August 2015, CBOE acquired the LiveVol trading analytics platforms, including Livevol Core, Livevol Pro, and Livevol X. Livevol X was sold to Sterling Trading Tech in March 2017.

In January 2016, CBOE purchased a majority stake in Vest Financial, an investment adviser specializing in options-centric products.

In March 2017, CBOE acquired BATS Global Markets, second-largest US stock exchange by shares traded, for approximately US$3.2 billion. Over the next few years, CBOE migrated its exchanges onto the BATS technology platform.

In October 2017, the company rebranded from CBOE Holdings to Cboe Global Markets.

In August 2018, the company delisted from the Nasdaq and listed its shares on its own exchange.

In September 2019, CBOE relocated its headquarters to the Old Chicago Main Post Office and began construction of a new trading floor in the Chicago Board of Trade building, which was the space the exchange originally occupied in the 1970s and 1980s. The new trading floor opened in June 2022.

In February 2020, Cboe acquired two data analytics firms, Hanweck and FT Options.

In May 2020, the company expanded into Canada via the acquisition of MATCHNow, which operated an alternative trading system (ATS).

In June 2020, CBOE acquired Trade Alert, a New York-based order flow analysis service provider.

In July 2020, Cboe acquired the remaining 80% of EuroCCP, a Dutch clearing house, that it did not already own.

Cboe acquired another ATS operator, BIDS Trading, in October 2020.

In June 2021, Cboe acquired Chi-X Asia Pacific, which owned exchanges in Japan and Australia.

In November 2021, Cboe acquired NEO, a Canadian stock exchange operator, which was rebranded as Cboe Canada.

In May 2022, Cboe acquired Eris Digital Holdings (ErisX), a US-based digital asset spot market, regulated futures contracts exchange, and regulated clearinghouse, which was renamed CBOE Digital. The company took a $460 million writedown on the investment shortly thereafter.

In September 2023, CEO Edward Tilly resigned after failing to disclose personal relationships with colleagues.

In September 2024, the company partnered with Globacap to create a U.S. trading platform for shares of closely held companies.

Fredric Tomczyk, CEO from 2023 to 2025, was succeeded by Craig Donohue in May 2025.

In August 2025, the company shut its operations in Japan.

In April 2026, the company agreed to sell its Canadian and Australian equities businesses to TMX Group for US$300 million.

In May 2026, the company laid off 20% of its staff.

In June 2026, in partnership with Charles Schwab Corporation, the company began work on yes-or-no options contracts tied to the performance of the S&P 500.

== Legal and regulatory issues ==
=== Abusive short selling ===
In 2013, the company paid a $6 million penalty and implemented "major remedial measures" to settle charges that it failed to properly enforce rules to prevent abusive short selling.

=== Alleged patent infringement ===
In 2007, the International Securities Exchange (ISE) sued CBOE, alleging that the company infringed on ISE's patent for "Automated Exchange for Trading Derivative Securities". The judge sided with CBOE, and after ISE continued to litigate, in 2016, ISE was ordered to pay $6 million to CBOE for attorneys fees.

=== Complaint against former director ===
In 2024, William Carlson, founder of Belvedere Trading, filed a complaint with the Illinois Attorney Registration and Disciplinary Commission (ARDC) against Mark Francis Duffy, a former director at CBOE Global Markets. Carlson alleged that Duffy did not act on significant evidence of financial misconduct at Belvedere Trading while working as both the firm's legal counsel and a CBOE director. The complaint further suggested that Duffy's dual role may have hindered regulatory oversight and contributed to continued financial irregularities at the company. In June 2025, Carson publicly accused individuals associated with Belvedere and Cboe of participating in a $35 million equity fraud and cover-up scheme. In a police complaint and related filings, Carlson alleged that Duffy was made aware of the misconduct as early as 2011 but failed to act despite being compensated to review the case. Carlson also claimed that Belvedere Trading, a Cboe member firm, and several implicated individuals were Cboe members, raising concerns about potential conflicts of interest and lapses in Cboe's self-regulatory oversight.
