= Phason =

Collective excitation in aperiodic materials

In physics, a phason is a form of collective excitation found in aperiodic crystal structures. Phasons are a type of quasiparticle: an emergent phenomenon of many-particle systems. The phason can also be seen as a degree of freedom unique to quasicrystals. Similar to phonons, phasons are quasiparticles associated with atomic motion. However, whereas phonons are related to the translation of atoms, phasons are associated with atomic rearrangement. As a result of this rearrangement, or modulation, the waves that describe the position of atoms in the crystal change phase—hence the term "phason". In the language of the superspace picture commonly employed in the description of aperiodic crystals in which the aperiodic function is obtained via projection from a higher dimensional periodic function, the 'phason' displacement can be seen as displacement of the (higher-dimensional) lattice points in the perpendicular space.

Phasons can travel faster than the speed of sound within quasicrystalline materials, giving these materials a higher thermal conductivity than materials in which the transfer of heat is carried out only by phonons. Different phasonic modes can change the material properties of a quasicrystal.

In the superspace representation, aperiodic crystals can be obtained from a periodic crystal of higher dimension by projection to a lower dimensional space– this is commonly referred to as the cut-and-project method. While phonons change the position of atoms relative to the crystal structure in space, phasons change the position of atoms relative to the quasicrystal structure and the cut-through superspace that defines it. Therefore, phonon modes are excitations of the "in-plane" real (also called parallel, direct, or external) space, whereas phasons are excitations of the perpendicular (also called internal or virtual) space.

Phasons may be described in terms of hydrodynamic theory: when going from a homogenous fluid to a quasicrystal, hydrodynamic theory predicts six new modes arising from the translational symmetry breaking in the parallel and perpendicular spaces. Three of these modes (corresponding to the parallel space) are acoustic phonon modes, while the remaining three are diffusive phason modes. In incommensurately-modulated crystals, phasons may be constructed from a coherent superposition of phonons of the unmodulated parent structure, though this is not possible for quasicrystals. Hydrodynamic analysis of quasicrystals predicts that, while the strain relaxation of phonons is relatively rapid, relaxation of phason strain is diffusive and is much slower. Therefore, metastable quasicrystals grown by rapid quenching from the melt exhibit built-in phason strain associated with shifts and anisotropic broadenings of X-ray and electron diffraction peaks.

== See also ==
- Quasicrystal
- Quasiparticle

== Books ==
- Steinhardt PJ, Ostlund S (1987). The Physics of Quasicrystals. Singapore: World Scientific. ISBN 978-9971-5-0226-3.
- Jaric MV, ed. (1988). Introduction to Quasicrystals. Aperiodicity and Order. Vol. 1. Academic Press. ISBN 978-0-12-040601-2.
- Jaric MV, ed. (1989). Introduction to the Mathematics of Quasicrystals. Aperiodicity and Order. Vol. 2. Academic Press. ISBN 978-0-12-040601-2.
- DiVincenzo DP, Steinhardt PJ, eds. (1991). Quasicrystals: The State of the Art. Directions in Condensed Matter Physics. Vol. 11. Singapore: World Scientific. ISBN 978-981-02-0522-5.
- Senechal M (1995). Quasicrystals and Geometry. Cambridge University Press. ISBN 978-0-521-57541-6.
- Patera J (1998). Quasicrystals and Discrete Geometry. American Mathematical Society. ISBN 978-0-8218-0682-1.
- Belin-Ferre E, Berger C, Quiquandon M, Sadoc A, eds. (2000). Quasicrystals. World Scientific Publishing Company. ISBN 978-981-02-4281-7.
- Trebin HR, ed. (2003). Quasicrystals: Structure and Physical Properties. Wiley-VCH. ISBN 978-3-527-40399-8.
- Janssen T, Chapuis G, Boissieu (2018). Aperiodic structures: from modulated structures to quasicrystals. Oxford Science Publications. ISBN 978-0-19-882444-2.
- Fujiwara T, Ishii Y (2008). Quasicrystals. Singapore: Elsevier. ISBN 978-0-444-51418-9.
