= Option style =

Class in which an option falls in finance

In finance, the style or family of an option is the class into which the option falls, usually defined by the dates on which the option may be exercised. The vast majority of options are either European or American (style) options. These options—as well as others where the payoff is calculated similarly—are referred to as "vanilla options". Options where the payoff is calculated differently are categorized as "exotic options". Exotic options can pose challenging problems in valuation and hedging.

== American and European options ==
The key difference between American and European options relates to when the options can be exercised:

- A European option may be exercised only at the expiration date of the option, i.e. at a single pre-defined point in time.
- An American option on the other hand may be exercised at any time before the expiration date.

For both, the payoff—when it occurs—is given by

- $\max\{(S-K), 0\}$, for a call option
- $\max\{(K-S), 0\}$, for a put option

where $K$ is the strike price and $S$ is the spot price of the underlying asset.

Option contracts traded on futures exchanges are mainly American-style, whereas those traded over-the-counter are mainly European.

Most stock and equity options are American options, while indexes are generally represented by European options. Commodity options can be either style.

=== Expiration date ===
Traditional monthly American options expire the third Saturday of every month (or the third Friday if the first of the month begins on a Saturday). They are closed for trading the Friday prior.

European options traditionally expire the Friday prior to the third Saturday of every month. Therefore, they are closed for trading the Thursday prior to the third Saturday of every month.

=== Difference in value ===
Assuming an arbitrage-free market, a partial differential equation known as the Black-Scholes equation can be derived to describe the prices of derivative securities as a function of few parameters. Under simplifying assumptions of the widely adopted Black model, the Black-Scholes equation for European options has a closed-form solution known as the Black-Scholes formula. In general, no corresponding formula exist for American options, but a choice of methods to approximate the price are available (for example Roll-Geske-Whaley, Barone-Adesi and Whaley, Bjerksund and Stensland, binomial options model by Cox-Ross-Rubinstein, Black's approximation and others; there is no consensus on which is preferable). Obtaining a general formula for American options without assuming constant volatility is one of finance's unsolved problems.

An investor holding an American-style option and seeking optimal value will only exercise it before maturity under certain circumstances. Owners who wish to realise the full value of their option will mostly prefer to sell it as late as possible, rather than exercise it immediately, which sacrifices the time value. See early exercise consideration for a discussion of when it makes sense to exercise early.

Where an American and a European option are otherwise identical (having the same strike price, etc.), the American option will be worth at least as much as the European (which it entails). If it is worth more, then the difference is a guide to the likelihood of early exercise. In practice, one can calculate the Black–Scholes price of a European option that is equivalent to the American option (except for the exercise dates). The difference between the two prices can then be used to calibrate the more complex American option model.

To account for the American's higher value there must be some situations in which it is optimal to exercise the American option before the expiration date. This can arise in several ways, such as:

- An in the money (ITM) call option on a stock is often exercised just before the stock pays a dividend that would lower its value by more than the option's remaining time value.
- A put option will usually be exercised early if the underlying asset files for bankruptcy.
- A deep ITM currency option (FX option) where the strike currency has a lower interest rate than the currency to be received will often be exercised early because the time value sacrificed is less valuable than the expected depreciation of the received currency against the strike.
- An American bond option on the dirty price of a bond (such as some convertible bonds) may be exercised immediately if ITM and a coupon is due.

== Less common exercise rights ==
There are other, more unusual exercise styles in which the payoff value remains the same as a standard option (as in the classic American and European options above) but where early exercise occurs differently:

=== Bermudan option ===
- A Bermudan option is an option where the buyer has the right to exercise at a set (always discretely spaced) number of times. This is intermediate between a European option—which allows exercise at a single time, namely expiry—and an American option, which allows exercise at any time (the name is jocular: Bermuda, a British overseas territory, is somewhat American and somewhat European—in terms of both option style and physical location—but is nearer to American in terms of both). For example, a typical Bermudian swaption might confer the opportunity to enter into an interest rate swap. The option holder might decide to enter into the swap at the first exercise date (and so enter into, say, a ten-year swap) or defer and have the opportunity to enter in six months time (and so enter a nine-year and six-month swap); see Swaption: Valuation. Most exotic interest rate options are of Bermudan style.

=== Canary option ===
- A Canary option is an option whose exercise style lies somewhere between European options and Bermudian options. (The name refers to the relative geography of the Canary Islands.) Typically, the holder can exercise the option at quarterly dates, but not before a set time period (typically one year) has elapsed. The ability to exercise the option ends prior to the maturity date of the product. The term was coined by Keith Kline, who at the time was an agency fixed income trader at the Bank of New York.

=== Capped-style option ===
- A capped-style option is not an interest rate cap but a conventional option with a pre-defined profit cap written into the contract. A capped-style option is automatically exercised when the underlying security closes at a price making the option's mark to market match the specified amount.

=== Compound option ===
- A compound option is an option on another option, and as such presents the holder with two separate exercise dates and decisions. If the first exercise date arrives and the 'inner' option's market price is below the agreed strike the first option will be exercised (European style), giving the holder a further option at final maturity.

=== Shout option ===
- A shout option allows the holder effectively two exercise dates: during the life of the option they can (at any time) "shout" to the seller that they are locking-in the current price, and if this gives them a better deal than the payoff at maturity they'll use the underlying price on the shout date rather than the price at maturity to calculate their final payoff.

=== Double option ===
- A double option gives the purchaser a composite call-and-put option (an option to either buy or sell) in a single contract. This has only ever been available in commodities markets and has never been traded on exchange.

=== Swing option ===
- A swing option gives the purchaser the right to exercise one and only one call or put on any one of a number of specified exercise dates (this latter aspect is Bermudan). Penalties are imposed on the buyer if the net volume purchased exceeds or falls below specified upper and lower limits. Allows the buyer to "swing" the price of the underlying asset. Primarily used in energy trading.

=== Evergreen option ===
- An evergreen option is an option where the buyer has the right to exercise by providing a pre-determined period of notice. This option could be either American or European in nature or alternatively it could be combined with option styles that have non-vanilla exercise rights. For example, an 'Evergreen-Bermudan' option provides the buyer of the option with the right to exercise at set specific points in time after providing the other counterparty with a pre-determined period of notice of their intent to exercise the option. Evergreen options provide sellers with a period of time to prepare for settlement once the buyer has exercised their rights under the option. Embedding evergreen optionality within on and off-balance sheet products can enable counterparties (such as banks that must adhere to Basel III) to lengthen their inflow or outflow obligations.

== "Exotic" options with standard exercise styles ==
These options can be exercised either European style or American style; they differ from the plain vanilla option only in the calculation of their payoff value:

=== Composite option ===
- A cross option (or composite option) is an option on some underlying asset in one currency with a strike denominated in another currency. For example, a standard call option on IBM, which is denominated in dollars, pays $\max(S-K,0) \cdot \text{USD}$ (where S is the stock price at maturity and K is the strike price). A composite stock option might instead pay $\max((S-K),0) FX_T \cdot \text{JPY}$, where $FX_T$ is the prevailing exchange rate, that is, $FX_T \cdot \text{JPY} = 1 \cdot \text{USD}$ on the exercise date. The pricing of such options naturally needs to take into account exchange rate volatility and the correlation between the exchange rate of the two currencies involved and the underlying stock price.

=== Quanto option ===
- A quanto option is a cross option in which the exchange rate is fixed at the outset of the trade, typically at 1. These options are often used by traders to gain exposure to foreign markets without exposure to exchange rate. Continuing the example from the composite option, the payoff of an IBM quanto call option would then be $\max((S-K),0) FX_0 \cdot \text{JPY}$, where $FX_0$ is the exchange rate fixed at the outset of the trade. This would be useful for traders in Japan who wish to be exposed to IBM stock price without exposure to JPY/USD exchange rate.

=== Exchange option ===
- An exchange option is the right to exchange one asset for another (such as a sugar future for a corporate bond).

=== Basket option ===
- A basket option is an option on the weighted average of several underlyings.

=== Rainbow option ===
- A rainbow option is a basket option where the weightings depend on the final performances of the components. A common special case is an option on the worst-performing of several stocks.

=== Low Exercise Price Option ===
- A Low Exercise Price Option (LEPO) is a European style call option with a low exercise price of $0.01.

=== Boston option ===
- A Boston option is an American option but with premium deferred until the option expiration date.

== Non-vanilla path-dependent "exotic" options ==
The following "exotic options" are still options, but have payoffs calculated quite differently from those above. Although these instruments are far more unusual they can also vary in exercise style (at least theoretically) between European and American:

=== Lookback option ===
- A lookback option is a path dependent option where the option owner has the right to buy (sell) the underlying instrument at its lowest (highest) price over some preceding period.
- A Russian option is a lookback option that runs for perpetuity. That is, there is no end to the period into which the owner can look back.

=== Asian option ===
- An Asian option (or average option) is an option where the payoff is not determined by the underlying price at maturity but by the average underlying price over some pre-set period of time. For example, an Asian call option might pay $\max \{(\bar{X}_3-K), 0\}$where $\bar{X}_3$ is the daily average over the past three months.
- There are two types of Asian options: Average Price Option (fixed strike) and Average Strike Option (floating strike).
- Asian options were originated in commodity markets to prevent option traders from attempting to manipulate the price of the underlying security on the exercise date.
- They were named 'Asian' because their creators were in Tokyo when they created the first pricing model.

=== Game option ===
- A game option or Israeli option is an option where the writer has the opportunity to cancel the option offered, but must pay the payoff at that point plus a penalty fee.

=== Cumulative Parisian option ===
- The payoff of a cumulative Parisian option is dependent on the total amount of time the underlying asset value has spent above or below a strike price.

=== Standard Parisian option ===
- The payoff of a standard Parisian option is dependent on the maximum amount of time the underlying asset value has spent consecutively above or below a strike price.

=== Barrier option ===
- A barrier option involves a mechanism where if a 'limit price' is crossed by the underlying, the option either can be exercised or can no longer be exercised.

=== Double barrier option ===
- A double barrier option involves a mechanism where if either of two 'limit prices' is crossed by the underlying, the option either can be exercised or can no longer be exercised.

=== Cumulative Parisian barrier option ===
- A cumulative Parisian barrier option involves a mechanism, in which if the total amount of time the underlying asset value has spent above or below a 'limit price' exceeds a certain threshold, then the option can be exercised or can no longer be exercised.

=== Standard Parisian barrier option ===
- A standard Parisian barrier option involves a mechanism, in which if the maximum amount of time the underlying asset value has spent consecutively above or below a 'limit price' exceeds a certain threshold, the option can be exercised or can no longer be exercised.

=== Reoption ===
- A reoption occurs when a contract has expired without having been exercised. The owner of the underlying security may then reoption the security.

=== Binary option ===
- A binary option (also known as a digital option) pays a fixed amount, or nothing at all, depending on the price of the underlying instrument at maturity.

=== Chooser option ===
- A chooser option gives the purchaser a fixed period of time to decide whether the derivative will be a vanilla call or put.

=== Forward start option ===
- A forward start option is an option whose strike price is determined in the future.

=== Cliquet option ===
- A cliquet option is a sequence of forward start options.

== See also ==
- CBOE
- Derivative (finance)
- Derivatives markets
- Financial economics
- Financial instrument
- Finance
- Futures contracts
- Monte Carlo methods in finance

=== Options ===
- Binary option
- Bond option
- Credit default option
- Exotic interest rate option
- Foreign exchange option
- Interest rate cap and floor
- Options on futures
- Rainbow option
- Real option
- Stock option
- Swaption
- Warrant

=== Related ===
- Covered call
- Moneyness
- Naked put
- Option (finance)
- Option time value
- Put option
- Put–call parity
- Smooth pasting
