= Turbo (finance) =

A turbo is a leveraged financial derivative first introduced by Goldman Sachs in 2004. They are tradable by institutional and private investors and have characteristics similar to contracts for difference and covered warrants. Turbo's are popular in Germany and the Netherlands. Société Générale SA and BNP Paribas are among the top issuers in Europe.

== Characteristics ==
The most important characteristic of a turbo is the strict connection of its value to the price of the underlying asset, which is generally a stock or an index. The value of the underlying stock is multiplied by the leverage value to give the value of the turbo. Unlike other financial derivatives, the leverage of a turbo is kept constant on a daily basis. However the issuer can change the leverage by a predetermined fixed procedure.

The rationale of a rolling turbo arises from a combination of a predictable course process of the base value stock and the promise of a proportionally higher profit than would be possible with the purchase of the base stock. Rolling turbos also offer the possibility of speculating on falling quotations. On the DAX rolling turbos with leverages between 5 and 35 are offered.

== Comparison to other derivatives ==
- Its lifetime is usually not time-limited.
- Unlike financial derivatives that are forced to terminate after severe exchange rate fluctuations, the risk of a catastrophic loss is smaller.

== German regulations ==
In Germany the profit that private investors make from a rolling turbo is subject to tax. The investor must also comply with the German § 37d securities trading law.

== Dutch regulations ==
When Dutch authorities that oversee financial markets researched the usage of turbos in 2020, they found that 68% of traders lose money. Furthermore, their investigation concluded that two thirds of turbos reach their knockout point, meaning that the owner loses (nearly) all of the invested capital. They also found that many people use extreme amounts of leverage, sometimes 100x, meaning that a 1% change in the underlying stock price will be amplified 100x, leading to greater risk of capital destruction. This led the authorities to introduce new rules which capped the leverage at a maximum of 30x for currency pairs, 20x for index funds and commodities, and 5x for individual stocks.

== See also ==
- Contract for difference
- Turbo warrant
- Covered warrant
