= Boston option =

Type of American investment

A Boston option, also known as a deferred premium option, is a type of American option. This type of option is considered a long-term option due to how premium payments are usually due a year after a contract is started. Many of the traded options that go on are in the American option style like the Boston option.

== Use ==
The Boston Option works by deferring payment until a later date. This in return causes the investment to have more illiquidity than a standard form of investment. These forms of options tend to be an exotic option because of how they are structured. What makes this different than standard options is that a Boston option is usually created through a personalized contract instead of an open obligation from standardized market regulations.

One of the most common ways a Boston option can be used is in the form of investments. These types of annuities help those investing receive regular payouts over a given period of time. An individual retirement account is a well known as a deferred payment investment due to how these investments are paid out after a given date.

Deferred premiums are calculated by taking the gross premium as well as any monthly, quarterly, and or semiannual premiums to the agreed due date. Any deferred premium that has already been collected will then be subtracted by the found amount.
