= David X. Li =

Canadian quantitative analyst (born 1960s)

- Education: Laval University; University of Waterloo
- Occupations: Actuary; Quantitative analyst

David X. Li (Chinese: 李祥林; pinyin: Lǐ Xiánglín born Nanjing, China in the 1960s) is a Chinese-born Canadian quantitative analyst and actuary who pioneered the use of Gaussian copula models for the pricing of collateralized debt obligations (CDOs) in the early 2000s. The Financial Times has called him "the world's most influential actuary", while after the 2008 financial crisis, to which Li's model has been partly credited to blame, his model has been called a "recipe for disaster" in the hands of those who did not fully understand his research and misapplied it. Widespread application of simplified Gaussian copula models to financial products such as securities may have contributed to the 2008 financial crisis. David Li is currently an adjunct professor at the University of Waterloo in the Statistics and Actuarial Sciences department.

== Early life and education ==
Li was born as Li Xianglin and raised in a rural part of China during the 1960s; his family had been relocated during the Cultural Revolution to a rural village in southern China for "re-education". Li received a master's degree in economics from Nankai University. After leaving China in 1987 at the behest of the Chinese government to study capitalism in Western society, he earned an MBA from Laval University in Quebec, a MMath in Actuarial Science and PhD in statistics from the University of Waterloo in Waterloo, Ontario in 1995 with a thesis titled "An estimating function approach to credibility theory" under the supervision of Harry Panjer.

== Career ==
Li began his career in finance in 1997 at the Canadian Imperial Bank of Commerce in the World Markets division. He moved to New York City in 2000 where he became a partner in J.P. Morgan's RiskMetrics unit. By 2003 he was director and global head of credit derivatives research at Citigroup. In 2004 he moved to Barclays Capital and lead the credit quantitative analytics team. In 2008 Li moved to Beijing where he worked for China International Capital Corporation as the head of the risk management department.

David Li is currently an adjunct professor at the University of Waterloo in the Statistics and Actuarial Sciences department. He is also a professor at the Shanghai Advanced Institute of Finance (SAIF).

== CDOs and Gaussian copula ==
Li's paper "On Default Correlation: A Copula Function Approach" was the first appearance of the Gaussian copula applied to CDOs published in 2000, which quickly became a tool for financial institutions to correlate associations between multiple financial securities. This allowed for CDOs to be supposedly accurately priced for a wide range of investments that were previously too complex to price, such as mortgages.

However, after the 2008 financial crisis, the model has been seen as a "recipe for disaster". According to Nassim Nicholas Taleb, "People got very excited about the Gaussian copula because of its mathematical elegance, but the thing never worked. Co-association between securities is not measurable using correlation"; in other words, "anything that relies on correlation is charlatanism."

Li himself apparently understood the fallacy of his model, in 2005 saying "Very few people understand the essence of the model." Li also wrote that "The current copula framework gains its popularity owing to its simplicity....However, there is little theoretical justification of the current framework from financial economics....We essentially have a credit portfolio model without solid credit portfolio theory." Kai Gilkes of CreditSights says "Li can't be blamed"; although he invented the model, it was the bankers who misinterpreted and misused it.

=== Li's paper ===
Li's paper is called "On Default Correlation: A Copula Function Approach" (2000), published in Journal of Fixed Income, Vol. 9, Issue 4, pages 43–54. In section 1 through 5.3, Li describes actuarial math that sets the stage for his theory. The mathematics are from established statistical theory, actuarial models, and probability theory. In section 5.4, he uses Gaussian copula to measure event relationships, or mathematically, correlations, between random economic events, expressed as:

$$C_\rho(u,v) = \Phi \left(\Phi^{-1}(u), \Phi^{-1}(v); \rho \right)$$

In layman's terms, he proposes to quantify the relationship between two events "House A" defaulting and "House B" defaulting by looking at the dependence between their time-unit-default (or survival time; see survival analysis). While under some scenarios (such as real estate) this correlation appeared to work most of the time, the underlying problem is that the single numerical data of correlation is a poor way to summarize history, and hence is not enough to predict the future. From section 6.0 onward, the paper presents experimental results using the Gaussian copula.

== See also ==
- List of University of Waterloo people
