= ELW =

ELW may refer to:

- Eltham railway station, London, National Rail station code
- Evangelical Lutheran Worship, a guidebook for use in the Evangelical Lutheran Church in America
- Equity-Linked Warrant, a financial instrument otherwise known as a covered warrant

== See also ==
- Elw, a demi-human race from Wild Arms franchise
