= NDX (disambiguation) =

NDX or Nasdaq-100 is a stock market index.

NDX or ndx may also refer to:

- Nordic Derivatives Exchange, a derivatives market operated by the Nordic Growth Market
- Nduga language, the ISO 639-3 code ndx
- .ndx, one of the file types found in dBASE
