= Callable bull/bear contract =

A callable bull/bear contract, or CBBC in short form, is a derivative financial instrument that provides investors with a leveraged investment in underlying assets, which can be a single stock, or an index. CBBC is usually issued by third parties, mostly investment banks, but neither by stock exchanges nor by asset owners. It was first introduced in Europe and Australia in 2001, and it is now popular in United Kingdom, Germany, Switzerland, Italy, and Hong Kong. CBBC is actively traded among investors in Europe and Hong Kong, which is partially because it can cater to individual investors' behavioral biases (like lottery preferences).

== Principle ==
CBBC has two types of contracts, callable bull contract and callable bear contract, which are always issued in the money. By investing in a callable bull contract, investors are bullish on the prospect of the underlying asset and intend to capture its potential price appreciation. Conversely, investors buying a callable bear contract are bearish on the prospect of the underlying asset and try to make a profit in a falling market.

CBBC is typically issued at a price that represents the difference between the spot price of the underlying asset and the strike price of the CBBCs, plus a small premium (which is usually the funding cost). The strike price can be equal to or lower (bull)/higher (bear) than the call price. The call price is also referred to as "stop loss", "trigger point", "knockout point" or "barrier" by different traders.

However, CBBC will expire at a predefined date or will be called immediately by the issuers when the price of the underlying asset reaches a call price before expiry.

== See also ==
- Turbo warrant
- Option (finance)
