= Denis Gratias =

French scientist

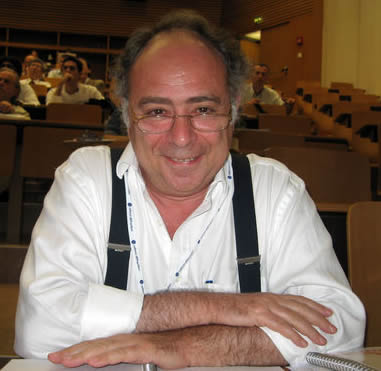
Denis Gratias

Denis Gratias, born on 22 September 1947 in Paris (France) is a French scientist, emeritus research director at the CNRS. His speciality is materials science, in particular crystallography. Since the discovery of quasicrystals by Dan Shechtman in 1982, he has contributed to their description, notably by developing theoretical models. He is a correspondent member at the French Academy of Sciences since 1994.

== Biography ==
Denis Gratias graduated as a chemical engineer in 1970 at Chimie ParisTech. In 1978, Denis Gratias defended his PhD thesis at the Structural Metallurgy Laboratory (CNRS-ENSCP), entitled "Crystallography of interfaces in homogeneous crystals" and developed with Richard Portier a formalism of fast electron diffraction. He then completed his post-doctoral training at the University of California, Berkeley where he was interested in the problems of statistical thermodynamics of generalized mean field (Cluster Variation Method).

Back in France, he took up his position at the Centre d'Études de Chimie Métallurgique (CECM), CNRS laboratory in Vitry-sur-Seine (France), but was soon invited by John-Werner Cahn to the Institute of Theoretical Physics at the University of California at Santa Barbara (USA) to participate in an interdisciplinary collaboration on theoretical physics and materials science. It was on this occasion that he was confronted with the unresolved problem of the 5th-order diffraction observed in April 1982 by Dan Shechtman. He contributed to the seminal paper of 1984 announcing the discovery of quasicrystals.

Upon his return, a long period of intense collaboration on crystallography began between the CECM at Vitry and the Centre de physique théorique (CPHT) of the École Polytechnique with Marianne Quiquandon, André Katz and Michel Duneau.

In 2000, Denis Gratias and his wife Marianne Quiquandon moved to Châtillon to the Laboratoire d'étude des microstructures (LEM [archive], a joint ONERA-CNRS laboratory), which he directed until 2009.

Since 2014, he has been CNRS Emeritus Research Director assigned to Chimie ParisTech, at the Institut de Recherche de Chimie Paris (IRCP), within the structural metallurgy team.

== Teaching ==
- 1991 to 2002: Lecturer at the Ecole Polytechnique (Physics of Materials, Small Classes of Quantum Mechanics)
- 1997 to 2006: Professor in charge of the Quantum Physics course at the Ecole Nationale Supérieure de Chimie de Paris (ENSCP).
