= Property derivative =

Financial concept

A property derivative is a financial derivative whose value is derived from the value of an underlying real estate asset. In practice, because individual real estate assets fall victim to market inefficiencies and are hard to accurately price, property derivative contracts are typically written based on a real estate property index. In turn, the real estate property index attempts to aggregate real estate market information to provide a more accurate representation of underlying real estate asset performance. Trading or taking positions in property derivatives is also known as synthetic real estate.

Property derivatives usually take the form of a total return swap, forward contract, futures, or can adopt a funded format where the property derivative is embedded into a bond or note structure. Under the total return swap or forward contract the parties will usually take contrary positions on the price movements of a property index. See Exotic derivative.

The only index used for writing property derivative contracts in the UK are the various property indices published by the Investment Property Databank (IPD) now owned by MSCI. The IPD Annual Index covers approximately 12,000 directly held UK property investments, market revalued in December 2015 at just under £202 billion equivalent to 49% of the UK investment market. IPD indices have also been used in a number of other countries such as Australia, France, Germany, Italy, Japan and Switzerland as the basis for commercial property derivatives. In the United States commercial property utilizes the National Council of Real Estate Investment Fiduciaries (NCREIF) property index the NPI. There are two main residential real estate indices in the United States which trade - Radar Logic's RPX, and the main index - S&P/Case-Shiller Home Price Indices (see Case-Shiller index).

== Uses ==
Property derivatives provide the investor with the ability to:

- Gain or reduce exposure to the property market.
- Hedge a current position in the physical assets.
- Change the composition of a portfolio quickly, i.e., switch out of Retail property and into Industrial.
- Speculate on the property market

All of these objectives can be achieved without having to transact in physical property; synthetic real estate.

== Defining property market performance ==
To create a derivative, there needs to be a point of reference for the performance of the market against which the derivative contracts are priced.

In the case of property derivatives, this reference is provided by the Investment Property Databank index in the United Kingdom, and NCREIF, S&P/Case-Shiller and Rexx in the United States.

The IPD Index Property Index provide a number of indices which relate to performance of commercial property. There are many indices reflecting sectors and sub-sectors of the commercial property market. To date, much of the interest in property derivatives relates to the UK market and its sub-sectors.

== Types ==
There are three main types of property derivative in use in the UK property market: Property Index Notes(PINs), Total Return Swap (TRS), and Forwards which incorporates the IPD Property Index Futures listed on Eurex.

In the United States property derivative trading is primarily through forwards and future contracts. Forwards agreements are made generally on the RPX and NCREIF indices. Futures trading is done by the CME Group via Globex utilizing the S&P/Case-Shiller Home Price Indices.

=== Property index notes ===
The PINs are essentially bonds. The cash flows of these bonds are structured in a way that is meant to be similar to a transaction in the physical property. This means that the PIN pays the capital return on redemption of the bond and it pays a quarterly coupon to investors.

In this way, the seller of the PIN pays the IPD annual index capital growth at redemption and the income return, paid quarterly (IPD) or monthly (FTSE), to the counter party. This means that the counter party is, therefore, receiving the total return of the UK commercial property market, just as they would with a physical transaction in property.

=== Total return swaps ===
A property total return swap is simply an exchange of cash flows. Here, the total return on property, as measured by the change in the relevant IPD or FTSE UK Commercial Property Index, is exchanged for the return on cash.

The UK IPD pricing mechanism was simplified on 15 January 2007. Rather than quoting libor +/- a spread, now it’s a fixed percentage. So take the Dec 2008 contract for example if it has a mid of -11.5%. This means that if you ‘buy’ the swap, you pay -11.5% (so receive 11.5% due to the -ve sign) to your counterparty and receive the performance of IPD. (Or pay it out if it’s a negative number.) No quarterly cashflows, simply one annual interest payment versus one annual property payment.

=== Forwards/futures ===
A property forward contract is based upon the property returns in any annual period - the expected total return for example is agreed at trade, and on maturity the difference between the realized total return and the traded price is exchanged. Forward agreements are over the counter requiring a counter party to be found. Risk of default of either party must be considered in the trade

The CME Group has been trading in real estate futures since mid-2006. All trading is done electronically through the exchange who is the default counter party in all trades.

Since February 2009 Eurex, the international derivatives exchange, has listed Property Index Futures. The Future Contract is based upon the IPD UK Annual All Property Index Total Returns - the exchange lists five consecutive annual contracts with pricing based upon a par value of 100 + Expected percentage Total Annual Return in the related calendar year. The contract for the calendar year 2009, which expired in March 2010 (expiry is the last working day in the following March to ensure this is after publication of the IPD data) settled at 103.50, representing a +3.5% annual total return (as published by IPD). Though a nascent market, in 2010 a total of 3,304 contracts traded according to the Eurex website - representing £165m in notional property value.

== ISDA 2007 property index derivatives definitions ==
On Friday 4 May 2007 the International Swaps and Derivatives Association (ISDA) released the 2007 Property Index Derivatives Definitions. The definitions set out various market standard definitions which can be used in property derivatives transactions together with a standard form total return swap template and forward transaction template It is hoped that standardised documentation will kick start the market.
