= Smooth pasting =

Boundary condition

Smooth pasting (also called high-contact condition) is a kind of boundary condition used to model the American option. It tells that the American option value is maximized by an exercise strategy that makes the option value and option delta continuous.
