= Abe Sklar =

American mathematician (1925–2020)

- Born: November 25, 1925; Chicago, Illinois, USA
- Died: October 30, 2020 (aged 94); Chicago, Illinois, USA
- Education: University of Chicago; California Institute of Technology
- Scientific career
- Institutions: Illinois Institute of Technology
- Thesis: Summation Formulas Associated with a Class of Dirichlet Series (1956)
- Doctoral advisor: Tom M. Apostol
- Doctoral students: Clark Kimberling; Marjorie Senechal

Abe Sklar (November 25, 1925 – October 30, 2020) was an American mathematician and a professor of applied mathematics at the Illinois Institute of Technology (Illinois Tech) and the inventor of copulas in probability theory.

== Education and career ==
Sklar was born in Chicago to Jewish parents who immigrated to the United States from Ukraine. He attended Von Steuben High School and later enrolled at the University of Chicago in 1942, when he was only 16. Sklar went on to become a student of Tom M. Apostol at the California Institute of Technology, where he earned his Ph.D. in 1956. His students at IIT have included geometers Clark Kimberling and Marjorie Senechal.

In 1959, Sklar introduced the notion of and the name of "copulas" into probability theory and proved the theorem that bears his name, Sklar's theorem. That is, that multivariate cumulative distribution functions can be expressed in terms of copulas. This representation of distribution functions, which is valid in any dimension and unique when the margins are continuous, is the basis of copula modeling, a widespread data analytical technique used in statistics; this representation is often termed Sklar's representation. Schweizer–Sklar t-norms are also named after Sklar and Berthold Schweizer, who studied them together in the early 1960s.

== Bibliography ==
- Golland, Louise; McGuinness, Brian; Sklar, Abe, eds. (1994). Karl Menger - Reminiscences of the Vienna Circle and the Mathematical Colloquium. Dordrecht: Kluwer Academic Publishers. ISBN 0-7923-2711-X. OCLC 30026523.
- Menger, Karl; Schweizer, Berthold; Sklar, Abe; Sigmund; Schmetterer, Leopold; Gruber, Peter M.; Hlawka, Edmund, eds. (2002). Selecta Mathematica. Volume 1. Vienna. ISBN 978-3-7091-6110-4. OCLC 1149922502.
- Menger, Karl; Schweizer, Berthold; Sklar, Abe; Sigmund, Karl, eds. (2003). Selecta mathematica. Volume 2. Wien; New York: Springer-Verlag. ISBN 978-3-211-83834-1. OCLC 492462474.
- Schweizer, Berthold; Sklar, Abe (2005). Probabilistic metric spaces. Mineola, N.Y. ISBN 978-0-486-14375-0. OCLC 873840651.
