= Abraham Wikler =

American psychiatrist and neurologist (1910–1981)

- Born: October 12, 1910; Lower East Side of New York City, US
- Died: March 7, 1981 (aged 70); Lower East Side of New York City, US
- Education: Long Island College of Medicine, MD, 1935
- Occupations: Prison psychiatrist, substance abuse researcher, neurologist
- Spouse: Ada
- Children: Marjorie Senechal; Dan Wikler

Abraham Wikler (October 12, 1910 – March 7, 1981) was an American psychiatrist and neurologist who made important discoveries in drug addiction. He was one of the first to promote a view of addiction as conditioned behavior, and made the first observations of conditioned response in drug withdrawal symptoms. His research on conditioning and relapse played a pioneering role in the neuroscientific study of addiction.

== Biography ==
Wikler was born and grew up on the Lower East Side of New York City, the son of a Jewish butcher who had immigrated from the Probuzhna shtetl in Ukraine. He earned an M.D. from the Long Island College of Medicine in 1935.

He joined the Lexington Narcotic Hospital, a prison farm run by the United States Public Health Service for drug addicts in Lexington, Kentucky, as an intern in 1940. There, he ran the narcotic-withdrawal ward and worked to quantify effects of opiates on addicts. He became interested in the neurophysiological basis for addiction, and the physiological changes caused by addiction, after successfully diagnosing a patient who had previously been thought to be grieving as having sustained physical brain damage.

After the internship, he took a one-year fellowship at Yale University and Northwestern University, where he studied the work of Ivan Pavlov on conditioning. He then returned to Lexington as associate director and chief of the section on experimental neuropsychiatry, one of three permanent staff researchers at the facility. In his work there, he observed both classical conditioning and operant conditioning in humans and in studies with rodents; from these observations, he hypothesized that conditioning led addicts to relapse long after the physical symptoms of their addiction had faded, and that the "hustling" behavior of addicts seeking their next fix was a symptom of conditioning.

Wikler retired from the USPHS in 1963 and joined the faculty of the University of Kentucky. In 1967, the alumni association of the SUNY Downstate Medical Center (to which the Long Island College of Medicine had been renamed) gave him their Alumni Achievement Medallion for Distinguished Service to American Medicine. In 1976, he won the Nathan B. Eddy Award of the College on Problems of Drug Dependence. He had four children; the oldest, Marjorie Senechal, became a mathematician and historian of science at Smith College. A son, Daniel Wikler, is a bioethicist with the Harvard T.H. Chan School of Public Health. He died on March 7, 1981, in Lexington, Kentucky.
