= Nordic Derivatives Exchange =

Derivatives market

The Nordic Derivatives Exchange (NDX) is a derivatives market operated by the Nordic Growth Market. Both are supervised by the Swedish Financial Supervisory Authority, (Swedish: Finansinspektionen), and operate as electronic exchanges on a shared platform.

NDX was initially offered listing and trading of Warrants. The market place has now broadened to include listing and trading of bonds - known as NDX Bonds. The purpose of NDX is to offer issuers, and other market participants, a flexible market for all types of derivatives and structured products.

In the period January–June 2006, warrants worth a total value of SEK 7.1 billion were traded on NDX.
