= Marianne Quiquandon =

French metallurgist

Marianne Quiquandon (also published as Marianne Cornier) is a French metallurgist for the French National Centre for Scientific Research (CNRS), and a member of the structural metallurgy team in the Institut de Recherche de Chimie Paris (IRCP), a joint research institute of CNRS and Chimie ParisTech. Her research involves the study of quasicrystals in aluminum alloys and the crystallographic properties of generic twisted bilayers, with her husband Denis Gratias.

Quiquandon earned a master's degree in 1981 at Pierre and Marie Curie University, and began work at CNRS in Michel Fayard’s group in the Centre d'Étude de Chimie Métallurgique (Vitry-sur-Seine), where she completed a Ph.D. in 1988 on the elastic dynamic diffraction theory of fast electrons by crystals and quasicrystals. She worked from 2000 to 2014 in the laboratory for the study of microstructures (LEM, a joint ONERA-CNRS laboratory, Châtillon) on the description of structural models of quasicrystals and approximant phases in alloys.

Quiquandon is a member of the Société philomathique de Paris.

== Selected publications ==
- Cornier-Quiquandon, M.; Quivy, A.; Lefebvre, S.; Elkaim, E.; Heger, G.; Katz, A.; Gratias, D. (August 1991), "Neutron-diffraction study of icosahedral Al-Cu-Fe single quasicrystals", Physical Review B, 44 (5): 2071–2084, Bibcode:1991PhRvB..44.2071C, doi:10.1103/physrevb.44.2071, PMID 9999756
- Quiquandon, M.; Quivy, A.; Devaud, J.; Faudot, F.; Lefebvre, S.; Bessière, M.; Calvayrac, Y. (April 1996), "Quasicrystal and approximant structures in the Al-Cu-Fe system", Journal of Physics: Condensed Matter, 8 (15): 2487–2512, Bibcode:1996JPCM....8.2487Q, doi:10.1088/0953-8984/8/15/002
- Sirindil, Abdullah; Kobold, Raphael; Mompiou, Frédéric; Lartigue-Korinek, Sylvie; Perriere, Loic; Patriarche, Gilles; Quiquandon, Marianne; Gratias, Denis (October 2018), "Atomic scale analyses of $\Z$-module defects in an NiZr alloy", Acta Crystallographica Section A: Foundations and Advances, 74 (6): 647–658, Bibcode:2018AcCry..74..647S, doi:10.1107/s2053273318011439, PMC 6207914, PMID 30378576
