= Shanghai Advanced Institute of Finance =

SAIF logo

The Shanghai Advanced Institute of Finance (SAIF; Chinese: 上海高级金融学院) at Shanghai Jiao Tong University was established on April 19, 2009, with strategic and financial support from the Shanghai Municipal Government.

It offers the following programs:

- Finance MBA: 2-year full-time program taught in English; 2-year part-time program taught in English and Chinese.
- Masters of Finance: 2-year Full-time program taught in English
- Finance EMBA :2-year part-time program taught in Chinese
- PhD in Finance
- Executive Development Program (EDP): Non-degree short-term courses tailormade for financial institutions
