= Forward start option =

Type of exotic option in finance

In finance, a forward start option is an option that starts at a specified future date with an expiration date set further in the future.

A forward start option starts at a specified date in the future; however, the premium is paid in advance, and the time of expiration is established at the time the forward start option is purchased.

== Pricing of Asset ==
Since the asset price at the start of this option is not known a priori, it is common to specify that the strike price will be set in the future, so that the option is initially at the money or a certain percentage in the money or out of the money.

This contract can be used to give an investor exposure to forward volatility.

== Example of Forward Start Option ==
Executive stock options can be viewed as a type of forward start option. This is because a company commits to granting at-the-money options to employees in the future.

== Forward Start Options Series ==
A series of consecutive forward start options creates a cliquet option.

== Valuation ==
In a Black–Scholes model, the value of the forward-start option is proportional to the asset price.

Therefore, the value of the forward-start option is a multiple of the current asset price, with that multiple depending on forward volatility.
