= Spread option =

Financial derivatives trading strategy

In finance, a spread option is a type of option where the payoff is based on the difference in price between two underlying assets. For example, the two assets could be crude oil and heating oil; trading such an option might be of interest to oil refineries, whose profits are a function of the difference between these two prices. Spread options are generally traded over the counter, rather than on exchange.

A 'spread option' is not the same as an 'option spread'. A spread option is a new, relatively rare type of exotic option on two underlyings, while an option spread is a combination trade: the purchase of one (vanilla) option and the sale of another option on the same underlying.

== Spread option valuation ==
For a spread call, the payoff can be written as $C = \max(0,S_1-S_2-K)$ where S1 and S2 are the prices of the two assets and K is a constant called the strike price. For a spread put it is $P = \max(0,K-S_1+S_2)$.

When K equals zero a spread option is the same as an option to exchange one asset for another. An explicit solution, Margrabe's formula, is available in this case, and this type of option is also known as a Margrabe option or an outperformance option.

In 1995 Kirk's Approximation, a formula valid when K is small but non-zero, was published. This amounts to a modification of the standard Black–Scholes formula, with a special expression for the sigma (volatility) to be used, which is based on the volatilities and the correlation of the two assets. Kirk's approximation can also be derived explicitly from Margrabe's formula.

The same year Pearson published an algorithm requiring a one-dimensional numerical integration to compute the option value. Used with an appropriate rotation of the domain and Gauss-Hermite quadrature, Choi (2018) showed that the numerical integral can be done very efficiently.

Li, Deng, and Zhou (2006) published accurate approximation formulas for both spread option prices and their Greeks.

== See also ==
- Rainbow option
