= Basket (finance) =

Financial portfolio of several securities

In finance, a basket is a weighted group (a linear combination) of several financial instruments. The purpose could be, for example, simultaneous buying or selling, for example, during program trading.

Baskets can be traded by buying the shares separately or through a professionally negotiated transaction through a broker. People trade in baskets to arbitrage with the futures traded on the index. Baskets are also used to denote a collection of currencies, such as the ECU in the past.

Certain specific specialized "baskets":

- A stock market index is a basket for all the securities in a particular exchange.
- A market basket is a basket for all the securities on a particular market.
- A combination of individual assets, used as an underlying of a basket option.

== Basket trading ==
Basket trading refers to the simultaneous purchase or sale of a group of securities as a single transaction. Institutional investors frequently use basket trades to replicate or hedge stock market index positions. This is common in index arbitrage, where traders exploit price differences between an index futures contract and the underlying basket of securities.

== See also ==
- Currency basket
