= Chooser option =

Type of option contract in finance

In finance, a chooser option is a special type of option contract. It gives the purchaser a fixed period to decide whether the derivative will be a European call or put option.

In more detail, a chooser option has a specified decision time $t_1$, where the buyer has to make the decision described above. Finally, at the expiration time $t_2$ the option expires. If the buyer has chosen that it should be a call option, the payout is $\max(S-K,0)$. For the choice of a put option, the payout is $\max(K-S,0)$. Here $K$ is the strike price of the option and $S$ is the stock price at expiry.

== Replication ==
For stocks without dividend, the chooser option can be replicated using one call option with strike price $K$ and expiration time $t_2$, and one put option with strike price $K e^{-r(t_2-t_1)}$ and expiration time $t_1$;.

== Valuation characteristics ==
Chooser options are generally more expensive than otherwise comparable plain-vanilla options because they give the holder the right to decide later whether the contract will become a call or a put. In an overview of exotic options, chooser options are described as contracts that allow that decision to be made on a fixed date before expiration, which gives the holder additional flexibility relative to a standard option.

Academic treatments of chooser-option pricing identify the choice date as a key determinant of value, since the option's premium reflects the value of delaying the decision between a call and a put until more information about the underlying asset's price path is available.

== Bibliography ==
- Yue-Kuen Kwok, Compound options (from Derivatives Week and Encyclopedia of Financial Engineering and Risk Management)
