= Quasicrystals and Geometry =

1995 book

- Title page for Quasicrystals and Geometry (1995)
- Author: Marjorie Senechal
- Publication date: 1995
- ISBN: 9780521372596

Quasicrystals and Geometry is a book on quasicrystals and aperiodic tiling by Marjorie Senechal, published in 1995 by Cambridge University Press (ISBN 0-521-37259-3).

One of the main themes of the book is to understand how the mathematical properties of aperiodic tilings such as the Penrose tiling, and in particular the existence of arbitrarily large patches of five-way rotational symmetry throughout these tilings, correspond to the properties of quasicrystals including the five-way symmetry of their Bragg peaks. Neither kind of symmetry is possible for a traditional periodic tiling or periodic crystal structure, and the interplay between these topics led from the 1960s into the 1990s to new developments and new fundamental definitions in both mathematics and crystallography.

== Topics ==
The book is divided into two parts. The first part covers the history of crystallography, the use of X-ray diffraction to study crystal structures through the Bragg peaks formed on their diffraction patterns, and the discovery in the early 1980s of quasicrystals, materials that form Bragg peaks in patterns with five-way symmetry, impossible for a repeating crystal structure. It models the arrangement of atoms in a substance by a Delone set, a set of points in the plane or in Euclidean space that are neither too closely spaced nor too far apart, and it discusses the mathematical and computational issues in X-ray diffraction and the construction of the diffraction spectrum from a Delone set. Finally, it discusses a method for constructing Delone sets that have Bragg peaks by projecting bounded subsets of higher-dimensional lattices into lower-dimensional spaces. This material also has strong connections to spectral theory and ergodic theory, deep topics in pure mathematics, but these were omitted in order to make the book accessible to non-specialists in those topics.

Another method for the construction of Delone sets that have Bragg peaks is to choose as points the vertices of certain aperiodic tilings such as the Penrose tiling. (There also exist other aperiodic tilings, such as the pinwheel tiling, for which the existence of discrete peaks in the diffraction pattern is less clear.) The second part of the book discusses methods for generating these tilings, including projections of higher-dimensional lattices as well as recursive constructions with hierarchical structure, and it discusses the long-range patterns that can be shown to exist in tilings constructed in these ways.

Included in the book are software for generating diffraction patterns and Penrose tilings, and a "pictorial atlas" of the diffraction patterns of known aperiodic tilings.

== Audience ==
Although the discovery of quasicrystals immediately set off a rush for applications in materials capable of withstanding high temperature, providing non-stick surfaces, or having other useful material properties, this book is more abstract and mathematical, and concerns mathematical models of quasicrystals rather than physical materials. Nevertheless, chemist István Hargittai writes that it can be read with interest by "students and researchers in mathematics, physics, materials science, and crystallography".
