= Marjorie Senechal =

American mathematician

- Born: Marjorie Wikler; 1939 (age 86–87); St. Louis, Missouri
- Education: University of Chicago; Illinois Institute of Technology
- Relatives: Abraham Wikler (father); Dan Wikler (brother)
- Scientific career
- Fields: Mathematics; History of science
- Workplaces: Smith College
- Doctoral advisor: Abe Sklar

Marjorie Lee Senechal (née Wikler, born 1939) is an American mathematician and historian of science, the Louise Wolff Kahn Professor Emerita in Mathematics and History of Science and Technology at Smith College and former editor-in-chief of the Mathematical Intelligencer, where she now edits the Mathematical Communities column. In mathematics, she is known for her work on tessellations and quasicrystals; she has also studied ancient Parthian electric batteries and published several books about silk.

== Biography ==
Senechal was born in St. Louis, Missouri, the oldest of four children of Abraham Wikler, a United States Public Health Service physician. The family soon moved to Lexington, Kentucky, and Senechal grew up as a "narco brat" on the grounds of the Lexington Narcotic Hospital, a prison farm for drug addicts, where her father was associate director. She was educated at the Training School of the University of Kentucky, a small school with only one class in each grade; Senechal later wrote that the school's too-easy classwork, snobbish classmates, and anti-Jewish discrimination made her miserable.

She left Lafayette High School after the 11th grade to begin her undergraduate studies as a pre-med at the University of Chicago, but soon switched to mathematics, graduating in 1960. While doing graduate studies at the Illinois Institute of Technology, she married mathematician Lester Senechal, and moved to Arizona with him before completing her own degree. Nevertheless, she finished her Ph.D. in 1965, under the supervision of Abe Sklar; her thesis concerned functional equations.

Unable to get her own faculty position at Arizona because of the anti-nepotism rules then in place, she and her husband visited Brazil, supported by a Fulbright Scholarship. They then moved to Massachusetts, where she took the faculty position at Smith that she would keep for the rest of her career. She eventually divorced Senechal, and married photographer Stan Sherer in 1989. She retired in 2007; a festival in 2006 honoring her impending retirement included the performance of a musical play that she wrote with The Talking Band member Ellen Maddow, loosely centered around the theme of aperiodic tilings and the life of amateur mathematician Robert Ammann.

== Awards and honors ==
Senechal won the Mathematical Association of America's Carl B. Allendoerfer Award for excellence in expository writing in Mathematics Magazine in 1982, for her article, "Which Tetrahedra Fill Space?" In 2008, her book American Silk 1830 – 1930 won the Millia Davenport Publication Award of the Costume Society of America. In 2012, she became a fellow of the American Mathematical Society.

== Books ==
- Crystalline Symmetries: An informal mathematical introduction ISBN 978-0-7503-0041-4 (Alan Hilger, 1990)
- Quasicrystals and Geometry ISBN 978-0-521-37259-6 (Cambridge University Press, 1995)
- Long Life to Your Children! A portrait of High Albania ISBN 978-1-55849-097-0 (with photographer S. Sherer, University of Massachusetts Press, 1997)
- Northampton's Century of Silk ISBN 978-0-9600828-3-4 (City of Northampton, Massachusetts, 2004)
- American Silk 1830 – 1930: Entrepreneurs and Artifacts ISBN 978-0-89672-589-8 (with Jacqueline Field and Madelyn Shaw, Texas Tech University Press, 2007)
- I Died For Beauty: Dorothy Wrinch and the Cultures of Science ISBN 978-0-19-973259-3 (Oxford University Press, 2012)
