= Covered warrant =

Warrant issued without an accompanying bond or equity

In finance, a covered warrant (sometimes called naked warrant) is a type of warrant that has been issued without an accompanying bond or equity. Like a normal warrant, it allows the holder to buy or sell a specific amount of equities, currency, or other financial instruments from the issuer at a specified price at a predetermined date.

Unlike normal warrants, they are usually issued by financial institutions instead of share-issuing companies and are listed as fully tradable securities on a number of stock exchanges. They can also have a variety of underlying instruments, not just equities, and may allow the holder to buy or sell the underlying asset. These attributes make it possible to use covered warrants as a tool to speculate on financial markets.

== Structure and features ==
A covered warrant gives the holder the right, but not the obligation, to buy ("call" warrant) or to sell ("put" warrant) an underlying asset at a specified price (the "strike" or "exercise" price) by a predetermined date. The price paid for this right is the "premium" and with covered warrants, you cannot lose more than this initial premium paid. They are limited liability instruments so there are no further payments or margin calls required to maintain a covered warrant position. Covered warrants offer a flexible alternative to private investors who seek to gain the leverage benefits of derivatives, but who wish to limit their risk.

When the issuer sells a warrant to an investor, they typically "cover" (or hedge) their exposure by buying the underlying instrument in the market. Covered warrants have an average life of 6 to 12 months, although some have maturities of several years.

In contrast to "traditional" equity warrants, with covered warrants, no new issuance of common stock occurs if the warrant is exercised. The underlying shares of common stock are usually either owned by the issuer of the covered warrants or the issuer has a mechanism, such as owning equity warrants for the underlying shares, through which they can obtain the shares.

Covered warrants are very popular due to the following qualities:

- Low cost
- Flexibility
- Limited liability
- Multi-strategy options

== Comparison with options ==
Covered warrants are very similar to options—much more so than "traditional" warrants. This is because covered warrants, just like options, can be created to allow holders to benefit from either rising prices or falling prices, by having both put and call warrants. They can also be created on a wide variety of underlying instruments, not just equities and they are fairly standardised and are mostly traded on exchanges.

The main difference is that warrants tend to have longer maturity dates, typically measured in years instead of months (as with options), and are easier to access for individuals as they can be bought and sold in the same way as shares in the stock exchange.

== Trading warrants ==
Warrants are listed on a number of major exchanges, including the London Stock Exchange, Singapore Exchange, and Hong Kong Stock Exchange. They are popular with individual investors and traders particularly in Hong Kong, China, and European countries (especially Italy). They are seen as a flexible tool offering leveraged exposure to a wide range of underlying assets such as equity, asset baskets, indices, currencies and commodities, while offering the benefits of transparency and liquidity.

Popular indices, for example, include the FTSE100 in the UK or Germany's DAX, and popular commodities include oil, gold, and wheat.

== Risks ==
The main exposure is to market risk as the warrant will be profitable only when the market price exceeds the strike price for a "call warrant" or is below the strike for a "put warrant". The inherent leveraging effect of the warrant significantly increases the risks and traders that are using warrant to speculate can make or lose significant sums very quickly. With covered warrants, the maximum loss is limited to the price paid for the warrant (ask or offer price) plus any commission or other transaction charges. Thus, although warrants are classed as high risk they are not as risky as other investment products such as contracts for differences or spread betting in which an investor would have to pay for future losses.

Another aspect of risk is that an investor could lose their entire investment if the corporation issuing the warrant becomes insolvent.

== See also ==
- Warrant (finance)
- Option (finance)
- Derivative (finance)
- Contract for difference
