= Warrant (finance) =

Security that entitles the holder to buy stock

In finance, a warrant is a security that entitles the holder to buy or sell stock, typically the stock of the issuing company, at a fixed price called the strike price.

Warrants and options are similar in that the two contractual financial instruments allow the holder special rights to buy securities. Both are discretionary, and have expiration dates. They differ mainly in that warrants are only issued by specific authorized institutions (typically the corporation on which the warrant is based), and in certain technical aspects of their trading and exercise.

Warrants are frequently attached to bonds or preferred stock as a sweetener, allowing the issuer to pay lower interest rates or dividends. They can be used to enhance the yield of the bonds and make them more attractive to potential buyers. Warrants can also be used in private equity deals. Frequently, these warrants are detachable, and can be sold independently of the bond or stock.

In the case of warrants issued with preferred stock, stockholders may need to detach and sell the warrant before they can receive dividend payments. Thus, it is sometimes beneficial to detach and sell a warrant as soon as possible so that the investor can earn dividends.

Warrants are actively traded in some financial markets, such as the German and Hong Kong stock exchanges.

== Structure and features ==
Warrants have similar characteristics to that of other equity derivatives, such as options, for instance:

- Exercising: A warrant is exercised when the holder informs the issuer their intention to purchase the shares underlying the warrant.

The warrant parameters, such as exercise price, are fixed shortly after the issue of the bond. With warrants, it is important to consider the following main characteristics:

- Premium: A warrant's "premium" represents how much extra you have to pay for your shares when buying them through the warrant as compared to buying them in the regular way.
- Gearing (leverage): A warrant's "gearing" is the way to ascertain how much more exposure you have to the underlying shares using the warrant as compared to the exposure you would have if you buy shares through the market.
- Expiration date: Warrant terms can include the period during which shares may be purchased and when the warrants expire.

== Secondary market ==
Sometimes the issuer will try to establish a market for the warrant and to register it with a listed exchange. In this case, the price can be obtained from a stockbroker. But often, warrants are privately held or not registered, which makes their prices less obvious. On the NYSE, warrants can be easily tracked by adding a "w" after the company's ticker symbol to check the warrant's price. Unregistered warrant transactions can still be facilitated between accredited parties and in fact, several secondary markets have been formed to provide liquidity for these investments.

== Comparison with options ==
Warrants are very similar to options. For instance, many warrants confer the same rights as equity options and warrants often can be traded in secondary markets like options. However, there also are several key differences between warrants and equity options:

- Warrants are issued by private parties, typically the corporation on which a warrant is based, rather than a public options exchange.
- Warrants issued by the company itself are dilutive. When the warrant issued by the company is exercised, the company issues new shares of stock, so the number of outstanding shares increases. When a call option is exercised, the owner of the call option receives an existing share from an assigned call writer (except in the case of employee stock options, where new shares are created and issued by the company upon exercise). Unlike common stock shares outstanding, warrants do not have voting rights.
- Unlisted warrants are considered over the counter instruments and thus are usually only traded by financial institutions with the capacity to settle and clear these types of transactions. Other warrants are traded on exchanges.
- Often, a warrant's lifetime is measured in years (as long as 15 years), while options are typically measured in months. Even LEAPS (long-term equity anticipation securities), the longest stock options available, tend to expire in two or three years. Upon expiration, the warrants are worthless unless the price of the common stock is greater than the exercise price.
- Warrants are not standardized like exchange-listed options. Although investors can write options on the ASX (or CBOE), they are not permitted to do so with ASX-listed warrants, since only companies can issue warrants. While each option contract is usually over 100 underlying ordinary shares, the number of warrants that must be exercised by the holder to buy the underlying asset depends on the conversion ratio set out in the offer documentation for the warrant issue.
- As with options, warrants slowly lose extrinsic value due to time decay. The sensitivity to this is called theta.

== Types of warrants ==
Depending on investment objectives, an investor may select different types of warrants:

- Equity warrants: Equity warrants can be call and put warrants. Callable warrants offer investors the right to buy shares of a company from that company at a specific price at a future date prior to expiration. Puttable warrants offer investors the right to sell shares of a company back to that company at a specific price at a future date prior to expiration.
- Covered warrants: A covered warrant is a warrant that has some underlying backing, for example the issuer will purchase the stock beforehand or will use other instruments to cover the option.
- Basket warrants: As with a regular equity index, warrants can be classified at, for example, an industry level. Thus, it mirrors the performance of the industry.
- Index warrants: Index warrants use an index as the underlying asset. Your risk is dispersed—using index call and index put warrants—just like with regular equity indexes. They are priced using index points. That is, you deal with cash, not directly with shares.
- Wedding warrants: are attached to the host debentures and can be exercised only if the host debentures are surrendered
- Detachable warrants: the warrant portion of the security can be detached from the debenture and traded separately.
- Naked warrants: are issued without an accompanying bond and, like traditional warrants, are traded on the stock exchange.
- Cash or Share Warrants in which the settlement may be in the form of either cash or physical delivery of the shares - depending on its status at expiry.

=== Traditional ===
Traditional warrants are issued in conjunction with a bond (known as a warrant-linked bond) and represent the right to acquire shares in the entity issuing the bond. In other words, the writer of a traditional warrant is also the issuer of the underlying instrument. Warrants are issued in this way as a "sweetener" to make the bond issue more attractive and to reduce the interest rate that must be offered in order to sell the bond issue.

==== Example ====
- Price paid for bond with warrants $P_0$
- Coupon payments C
- Maturity T
- Required rate of return r
- Face value of bond F

Value of warrants = $P_0 - \left(\sum_{t=1}^T\frac{C}{(1+r)^t}\right) - \frac{F}{(1+r)^T}.$

=== Covered or naked ===
Covered warrants, also known as naked warrants, are issued without an accompanying bond and, like traditional warrants, are traded on the stock exchange. They are typically issued by banks and securities firms and are settled for cash, e.g. do not involve the company who issues the shares that underlie the warrant. In most markets around the world, covered warrants are more popular than the traditional warrants described above. Financially they are also similar to call options, but are typically bought by retail investors, rather than investment funds or banks, who prefer the more keenly priced options which tend to trade on a different market. Covered warrants normally trade alongside equities, which makes them easier for retail investors to buy and sell them.

=== Third-party warrants ===
A third-party warrant is a derivative issued by the holders of the underlying instrument. Suppose a company issues warrants which give the holder the right to convert each warrant into one share at $500. This warrant is company-issued. Suppose, a mutual fund that holds shares of the company sells warrants against those shares, also exercisable at $500 per share. These are called third-party warrants. The primary advantage is that the instrument helps in the price discovery process. In the above case, the mutual fund selling a one-year warrant exercisable at $500 sends a signal to other investors that the stock may trade at $500-levels in one year. If volumes in such warrants are high, the price discovery process will be that much better; for it would mean that many investors believe that the stock will trade at that level in one year. Third-party warrants are essentially long-term call options. The seller of the warrants does a covered call-write. That is, the seller will hold the stock and sell warrants against them. If the stock does not cross $500, the buyer will not exercise the warrant. The seller will, therefore, keep the warrant premium.

== See also ==
- Contract for difference
- Dilutive security
