= Nordic Growth Market =

NGM Nordic Growth Market
- Type: Stock Exchange
- Location: Stockholm, Sweden
- Website: Nordic Growth Market

Nordic Growth Market (NGM Exchange) is a regulated exchange that delivers trading, exchange technology and public company services. Established in 1984, the exchange operates in Sweden, Finland, Denmark, and Norway. Since 2008, Nordic Growth Market is a fully owned subsidiary of Börse Stuttgart, one of the leading exchanges in Europe.

Nordic Growth Market operates NDX (Nordic Derivatives Exchange) — one of the leading markets for listing and electronic trading of derivatives and structured products in the Nordic region.

The exchange also provides listing and trading services in equities via two capital markets, NGM Equity and Nordic MTF. In 2013, they introduced the Nordic Pre Market. a platform for unlisted companies.

Nordic Growth Market is recognized for their innovative technology and their trading system, Elasticia, which has maintained a record of zero downtime since its launch in 2010. Nordic Growth Market trades all instruments on a single platform, serving a central gateway to the Nordic financial market.

Nordic Growth Market is the only exchange in the world which offers revenue sharing — meaning that they share their revenues with listed companies.
