= Rational pricing =

Assumption in financial economics

In financial economics, rational pricing is the assumption that asset pricing models must reflect the arbitrage-free price of the asset This argument underpins the fundamental theorem of asset pricing, and is a key aspect of mathematical finance, defining the pricing of derivatives and fixed income securities, and useful, also, in setting exchange rates, and in pricing shares, at the least aligning prices correctly.

The essential argument is that where a mismatch exists between two or more markets, arbitrage will occur such that the arbitrageur makes a risk-free profit by purchasing and short-selling simultaneously in both markets. By doing so, the arbitrageur may deliver the purchased asset to the buyer, receiving that higher price, whilst paying the seller on the cheaper market with the proceeds and pocketing the difference. As such, the law of one price holds across trading exchanges; prices of assets with identical cash flows equalise; and the price of assets with known future cash flows may be calculated in advance.

A fundamental distinction exists between theoretical pricing models, which derive fair-value mathematical relationships by assuming an arbitrage-free market, and arbitrage trading strategies, which market participants execute to monetize temporary real-world price discrepancies. The former are the focus of financial economics.

== Categories of argument ==
Rational pricing arguments, as outlined, generally fall into two distinct categories. However, in many market applications — such as swaps and fixed-income securities — the model derivation directly mirrors the execution trade, meaning a strict binary classification does not always apply. Both categories rely on the arbitrage mechanics detailed below.

- Theoretical models (derivation via Arbitrage-free constraints): Mathematical frameworks that derive exact fair value pricing formulas or relative price identities by assuming an arbitrage-free market. These models — such as the Black-Scholes option pricing formula, cost-of-carry futures pricing, or covered interest parity — use hypothetical cash-flow replication to show what an asset must cost to prevent deterministic arbitrage.
- Practical trading strategies (execution, given market inefficiencies): Practical trading methodologies used by market participants when market prices temporarily deviate from fair value. Strategies such as convertible arbitrage or dividend stripping do not derive market prices themselves; rather, they rely on long/short execution legs to monetize pricing discrepancies until convergence occurs.

== Arbitrage mechanics ==
Arbitrage is the practice of taking advantage of a state of imbalance between two (or possibly more) markets. Where this mismatch can be exploited (i.e. after transaction costs, storage costs, transport costs, dividends etc.) the arbitrageur can "lock in" a risk-free profit by purchasing and selling simultaneously in both markets.

In general, arbitrage ensures that "the law of one price" will hold; arbitrage also equalises the prices of assets with identical cash flows, and sets the price of assets with known future cash flows.

=== The law of one price ===
The same asset must trade at the same price on all markets ("the law of one price"). Where this is not true, the arbitrageur will:

1. buy the asset on the market where it has the lower price, and simultaneously sell it (short) on the second market at the higher price
2. deliver the asset to the buyer and receive that higher price
3. pay the seller on the cheaper market with the proceeds and pocket the difference.

=== Assets with identical cash flows ===
Two assets with identical cash flows must trade at the same price. Where this is not true, the arbitrageur will:

1. sell the asset with the higher price (short sell) and simultaneously buy the asset with the lower price
2. fund his purchase of the cheaper asset with the proceeds from the sale of the expensive asset and pocket the difference
3. deliver on his obligations to the buyer of the expensive asset, using the cash flows from the cheaper asset.

=== An asset with a known future-price ===
An asset with a known price in the future must today trade at that price discounted at the risk free rate.

Note that this condition can be viewed as an application of the above, where the two assets in question are the asset to be delivered and the risk free asset.

(a) where the discounted future price is higher than today's price:

1. The arbitrageur agrees to deliver the asset on the future date (i.e. sells forward) and simultaneously buys it today with borrowed money.
2. On the delivery date, the arbitrageur hands over the underlying, and receives the agreed price.
3. He then repays the lender the borrowed amount plus interest.
4. The difference between the agreed price and the amount repaid (i.e. owed) is the arbitrage profit.

(b) where the discounted future price is lower than today's price:

1. The arbitrageur agrees to pay for the asset on the future date (i.e. buys forward) and simultaneously sells (short) the underlying today; he invests (or banks) the proceeds.
2. On the delivery date, he cashes in the matured investment, which has appreciated at the risk free rate.
3. He then takes delivery of the underlying and pays the agreed price using the matured investment.
4. The difference between the maturity value and the agreed price is the arbitrage profit.

Point (b) is only possible for those holding the asset but not needing it until the future date. There may be few such parties if short-term demand exceeds supply, leading to backwardation.

== Fixed-income securities ==
Under rational pricing models, as outlined, two assets with identical cash flows must trade at the same price. Where this is not true, an arbitrageur will short the asset with the higher price and simultaneously buy the asset with the lower price. The sale of the higher priced asset funds his purchase of the cheaper asset, and the purchase of the cheaper asset allows him to deliver on his obligations to the buyer. Thus, the arbitrageur earns a risk-free profit.

In the case of fixed-income securities, since (1) an arbitrageur could reconstruct the cashflows of any instrument using (multiples or fractions of e.g.) zero coupon bonds, so (2) the above arbitrage relationship applies, but now linking interest rates and market-prices. The pricing formula for a fixed-income security is thus:

$$P_0 = \sum_{t=1}^T\frac{C_t}{(1+r_t)^t}$$

where each cash flow $C_t\,$ is discounted at the rate $r_t\,$ that matches the coupon date.

Often, the formula is expressed as

$$P_0 = \sum_{t=1}^ T C(t) \times P(t)$$

using prices instead of rates, where prices are more readily available.

Given this relationship, rational pricing in fact underpins interest rate modeling more generally, where the yield curve in entirety must be consistent with the prices of (key) individual instruments over their range of maturities. Investment banks and other market makers thus invest considerable resources in this "curve stripping"; see Bootstrapping (finance) and Multi-curve framework § Curve construction. At these institutions, specialized desks may focus on fixed income arbitrage, a strategy that exploits points on the yield curve that show any "mismatch".

== Futures ==
As above, an asset with a known price in the future must today trade at that price discounted at the risk free rate. Thus, in a futures contract, for no arbitrage to be possible, the forward price must be the same as the cost, including interest, of buying and storing the asset. In other words, the rational forward price represents the expected future value of the underlying discounted at the risk free rate, a condition known as spot–future parity. Then, for a simple, non-dividend paying asset, the value of the future/forward, $F(t)\,$, will be found by accumulating the present value $S(t)\,$ at time $t\,$ to maturity $T\,$ by the rate of risk-free return $r\,$:

$$F(t) = S(t)\times (1+r)^{(T-t)}\,$$

Were this to fail, and the discounted future price is higher than today's price, so the arbitrageur sells forward the asset and simultaneously buys it today on margin. On the delivery date, the arbitrageur hands over the underlying, receiving the agreed price, repaying the lender the amount due, and making the profit from arbitrage. Where the discounted future price is lower than today's price, the arbitrageur buys forward the asset and simultaneously shorts the underlying today. Note that rational pricing will not occur in situations of "normal backwardation".

== Swaps ==
Rational pricing underpins, also, the logic of swap valuation. Here, the instrument consists of two "legs", and to be arbitrage free, the terms of a swap contract are such that, initially, the net present value of both legs is equal. This must hold, since, if the two legs had differing values initially, an arbitrageur could: assume the position with the lower present value of payments; borrow funds equal to this present value to meet the cash flow obligations on the position; receive the corresponding payments - which have a higher present value - and use these to repay the debt on the borrowed funds. In the case of an interest rate swap, for example, where one party pays a fixed rate, and the other a floating rate, at initiation:

$P_\text{IRS} = P_\text{fixed} - P_\text{float}$

$$P_\text{fixed} = N  R  \sum_{i=1}^{n_1} d_i v_i$$
$P_\text{float} = N \sum_{j=1}^{n_2} r_j d_j v_j$

where $N$ is the notional, $R$ is the fixed rate as solved, $r_j$ are the forecast -IBOR floating rates, $n_1$ and $n_2$ are the number of payments, $d_i$ is the day count fraction, and $v_i$ is the discount factor.

Once trading, arbitrage arguments also apply, but now, continuing the example, with reference to other interest rate instruments. Thus, the floating leg of an interest rate swap can be decomposed into a series of forward rate agreements, while the fixed leg can be valued by comparison to a bond with a similar schedule of payments. (Also, the difference between the interest rate cap and floor values equate to the difference between the swap legs.) Here, too, where the values do not align, an arbitrageur could short sell the overpriced instrument, and use the proceeds to purchase the correctly priced instrument, pocket the difference, and then use payments generated to service the instrument on which she is short. See, again, fixed income arbitrage.

== Options ==
Under rational pricing assumptions, in a correctly priced options contract, the derivative premium (price), the strike price, and the spot price will be related such that arbitrage is not possible. Here, corresponding to the stereotypical arbitrage arguments above, so three single-period pricing formulae may be derived: delta hedging, the "replicating portfolio", and risk neutral valuation. Although these approaches result in different formulae they are, in fact, equivalent economically, and it is then valid to assume "risk neutrality" when pricing derivatives generally (outline follows). A more formal relationship is described at the fundamental theorem of arbitrage-free pricing.

The classic derivation assumes a "binomial" behavior of the underlying instrument, where we have only two states – up or down: i.e. if S is the current price, then in the next period the price will either be $S_\text{up}$ or $S_\text{down}$, and $S_u = S \times u$, and $S_d = S \times d$, where u and d are multipliers, with d < 1 < u and assuming d < 1+r < u. (The examples below use a call option, but put option formulae may be derived from these via put-call parity - also an arbitrage identity - or directly, applying the same arguments.) This logic trivially extends to a multi-period lattice approach in the binomial options model, where u and d are chosen consistent with volatility; it similarly underpins the Black–Scholes formula, in the limit.

=== Delta hedging ===
It is possible to create a position consisting of Δ shares and 1 call option sold, such that the position's value, i.e. its "intrinsic value", will be identical in the S up and S down states, and hence known with certainty, and the above relationship applies.

Under this approach - known as Delta hedging - we solve for Δ such that:
$$\begin{align}
V_p &= \Delta \times S_u - \max (S_u - k, 0) \\
&=  \Delta \times S_d - \max (S_d - k, 0) \\
\end{align}$$
where $V_p$ is the value of position in one period, and $k$ is the strike price.

Then, to solve for the value of the call:
$$V_t =  \Delta \times S - V_c$$
where $V_t$ is the value of position today and $V_c$ is the value of the call.

=== Risk neutral pricing ===
Option pricing models - as outlined - more typically assume risk neutrality, where the option value is the discounted expected value of the end of period intrinsic values - i.e. that the underlying share price is a "Martingale". Under this assumption:
$$\begin{align}
S &= \frac{p \times S_u + (1-p)\times S_d}{1 + r} \\
\Rightarrow p &= \frac{(1+r) - d}{u-d}\\
\end{align}$$

where p (under more formal treatments, q) is the probability of an up move in the underlying, (1-p) is the probability of a down move, and r is the risk-free rate.

Then, to return an option value consistent with this share price behaviour, we must say:
$$\begin{align}
C &= \frac{p\times C_u + (1-p) \times C_d}{1+r} \\
&= \frac{p\times \max(S_u - k, 0)  + (1-p) \times\max(S_d -k, 0)}{1+r} \\
\end{align}$$

=== The replicating portfolio ===
It is possible to create a position consisting of Δ shares and $B borrowed at the risk free rate, which will produce identical cash flows to one option on the underlying share. The position created is known as a replicating portfolio since its cash flows replicate those of the option, and per the above, its value must be that of the option.

Here solve simultaneously for $\Delta$ and B such that:
$$\begin{align}
\Delta \times S_u - B \times (1+r) &= \max(0, S_u - k)\\
\Delta \times S_d - B \times (1+r) &= \max(0, S_d - k)\\
\end{align}$$
then
$$\begin{align}
V_c = \Delta \times S - B\\
\end{align}$$

Note that there is no discounting here, as the interest rate appears only as part of the construction. This approach is therefore used in preference to others where it is not clear whether the risk free rate may be applied as the discount rate at each decision point, or whether, instead, a premium over risk free, differing by state, would be required. For example under real options analysis, managements' actions actually change the risk characteristics of the project in question, and hence the required rate of return could differ in the up- and down-states. For the valuation of employee stock options, modelling assumptions may similarly depart from rational pricing.

== Foreign exchange ==
Arbitrage pricing in the foreign exchange market holds that risk-free profit opportunities force exchange rates into alignment both in the foreign exchange forward market as a function of interest rate differentials, and in the foreign exchange spot market, across currency-pairs.

In the first case, arbitrage between two interest rates ensures covered interest parity, and the related pricing model: if one currency offers a higher interest rate than another, arbitrageurs borrow in the low-interest currency, convert to the high-interest currency at the spot rate, lend it, and simultaneously enter a forward contract to convert the proceeds back at maturity. This locks in a risk-free profit equal to the interest rate differential, forcing the forward exchange rate to adjust until the return on the domestic and foreign deposits is equalized. Here, we have:

$$F = S \frac {(1+i_d)} {(1+i_f)}$$,
where F is the forward exchange rate, S is the current spot exchange rate, i_{d} is the interest rate in domestic currency (base currency), i_{f} is the interest rate in foreign currency (quoted currency).

In the second case, cross currency arbitrage ensures that spot exchange rates must align across currency-pairs. Here, "triangular arbitrage" is the trading-strategy that exploits an arbitrage opportunity resulting from a pricing discrepancy among three different currencies: the arbitrage strategy involves three trades, exchanging the initial currency for a second, the second currency for a third, and the third currency for the initial.

Although a purchasing power parity argument can be made similar to that for (uncovered) interest arbitrage — the exchange rate will adjust until the same amount of goods could be purchased in either currency with the same beginning amount of funds — this must be considered an economic hypothesis and not an arbitrage identity. Thus, in practice, exchange rates (notoriously) deviate from their balance of payments equilibrium: distortions will be due to persistent trade imbalances, capital controls, and sovereign intervention; relatedly, market sentiment and currency speculation often drive short-term rates far from fundamental values. See Real exchange-rate puzzles.

== Shares ==
Arbitrage-type arguments are applied to the equilibrium pricing of shares (and other securities), resulting in the Arbitrage Pricing Theory. For shares, there are also several cases where arbitrage-trades will align the prices of related securities, relying on replication arguments similar to those above under option and bond pricing.

=== Share pricing ===
As outlined the Arbitrage Pricing Theory, or APT, provides a very general theory of asset pricing, and has become especially influential in the pricing of shares. Here, the expected return of a financial asset can be modelled as a linear function of various macro-economic factors, where sensitivity to changes in each factor is represented by a factor specific beta coefficient:

$$E\left(r_j\right) = r_f + b_{j1}F_1 + b_{j2}F_2 + ... + b_{jn}F_n + \epsilon_j$$

where
- $E(r_j)$ is the risky asset's expected return,
- $r_f$ is the risk free rate,
- $F_k$ is the macroeconomic factor,
- $b_{jk}$ is the sensitivity of the asset to factor $k$,
- and $\epsilon_j$ is the risky asset's idiosyncratic random shock with mean zero.

The model derived rate of return will then be used to price the asset correctly – the asset price should equal the expected end of period price discounted at the rate implied by model. If the price diverges, arbitrage should bring it back into line. Here, to perform the arbitrage, the investor creates a correctly priced asset (a synthetic asset), this being a portfolio of other assets which collectively have the same net-exposure to each of the macroeconomic factors as the mispriced asset but a different expected return. As above, the arbitrageur then short sells the asset which is relatively too expensive and uses the proceeds to buy the other; at "close out" she sells her owned asset - which has appreciated by a greater amount than the other - and returns the other, shorted, asset, profiting by the difference in returns.

While APT uses "arbitrage" in its name, it in fact relies on factor/statistical arbitrage (eliminating factor-specific variance across large portfolios), which assumes zero idiosyncratic risk, as opposed to replication as above.

The capital asset pricing model (CAPM) is an earlier, (more) influential theory on asset pricing. Although purely an equilibrium model - based on utility maximization, market clearing, and mean-variance investor preferences - it can, in some ways, be considered a "special case" of the APT; specifically, the CAPM's security market line represents a single-factor model of the asset price, where beta is exposure to changes in the value of the market as a whole.

=== Arbitrage trading-strategies ===
A clear example under this category is that of dual-listed companies (DLCs). Here, since the shares under both listings represent claims on exactly the same underlying cash flows, stock prices of the DLCs should move in lockstep (in efficient financial markets), as above. In practice, however, large differences from theoretical price parity can arise. Price differences between the two markets may be exploited by setting up arbitrage positions, where the typical strategy is to assume a long position in the relatively underpriced part of the DLC and a short position in the relatively overpriced part (which funds the former), profiting on both under convergence.

Another such strategy is convertible arbitrage, available where a convertible security, which can be converted into shares of the issuer's common stock, is mispriced relative to the latter. The arbitrage typically involves the simultaneous purchase of the convertible and the short sale of the share. If the bond is overpriced compared to the stock, the arbitrageur shorts the bond and buys the stock. (See generally Merton model and contingent claim analysis re the relationship between the corporate equity and its derivatives.)

Dividend stripping is the practice of buying shares a short period before a dividend is declared, "cum-dividend", and then selling them when they go "ex-dividend", when the previous owner is entitled to the dividend, and the share price (theoretically) drops by the amount of the dividend. This will be profitable where dividend income is greater than the share price decrease - a capital loss - or if the tax treatment of the two gives an advantage. Various arbitrage strategies exist here, including going long a dividend future and short the underlying stock (or a synthetic stock position).

Risk arbitrage attempts to exploit share-price inefficiencies between the two parties involved in a merger or other corporate event. Here it is assumed that the share price of the "target-company" will be equal to the offer price upon deal completion (or that the share prices will conform to the swap ratio), and the arbitrageur will buy the target's stock (or hold long and short positions based on the swap ratio) profiting when the stock price approaches the offer price, which will occur when the likelihood of deal consummation increases.

Note that under all these strategies, implementation may be problematic, and "Limits to Arbitrage" will be imposed by execution risk - when an aspect of the financial transaction does not materialize as anticipated - as well as counterparty and liquidity risks. More fundamentally, these rely, ultimately, on the prices converging, which may be slow to eventuate, if at all.

== See also ==
- Asset pricing § Rational pricing
- Contingent claim analysis
- Efficient-market hypothesis
- Fair value
- Financial economics § Arbitrage-free pricing and equilibrium
- Homo economicus
- List of valuation topics
- Limits to arbitrage
- No free lunch with vanishing risk
- Rational choice theory
- Rationality
- Self-financing portfolio
- Systemic risk
- Volatility arbitrage
