= Foreign exchange swap =

Simultaneous purchase and sale of identical amounts of one currency for another

In finance, a foreign exchange swap (forex swap or FX swap) is a simultaneous purchase and sale of identical amounts of one currency for another with two different value dates (normally spot to forward) and may use foreign exchange derivatives. An FX swap allows sums of a certain currency to be used to fund charges designated in another currency without acquiring foreign exchange risk. It permits companies that have funds in different currencies to manage them efficiently.

== Structure ==
A foreign exchange swap has two legs - a spot transaction and a forward transaction - that are executed simultaneously for the same quantity, and therefore offset each other. Forward foreign exchange transactions occur if both companies have a currency the other needs. It prevents negative foreign exchange risk for either party. Foreign exchange spot transactions are similar to forward foreign exchange transactions in terms of how they are agreed upon; however, they are planned for a specific date in the very near future, usually within the same week.

It is also common to trade "forward-forward" transactions, where the first leg is not a spot transaction, but already a forward date.

== Uses ==
The most common use of foreign exchange swaps is for institutions to fund their foreign exchange balances.

Once a foreign exchange transaction settles, the holder is left with a positive (or "long") position in one currency and a negative (or "short") position in another. In order to collect or pay any overnight interest due on these foreign balances, at the end of every day institutions will close out any foreign balances and re-institute them for the following day. To do this they typically use "tom-next" swaps, buying (or selling) a foreign amount settling tomorrow, and then doing the opposite, selling (or buying) it back settling the day after.

The interest collected or paid every night is referred to as the cost of carry. As currency traders know roughly how much holding a currency position will make or cost on a daily basis, specific trades are put on based on this; these are referred to as carry trades.

Companies may also use them to avoid foreign exchange risk.

Example:

A British Company may be long EUR from sales in Europe but operate primarily in Britain using GBP. However, they know that they need to pay their manufacturers in Europe in 1 month.

They could spot sell their EUR and buy GBP to cover their expenses in Britain, and then in one month spot buy EUR and sell GBP to pay their business partners in Europe.

However, this exposes them to FX risk. If Britain has financial trouble and the EUR/GBP exchange rate moves against them, they may have to spend a lot more GBP to get the same amount of EUR.

Therefore they create a 1 month swap, where they Sell EUR and Buy GBP on spot and simultaneously buy EUR and sell GBP on a 1 month (1M) forward. This significantly reduces their risk. The company knows they will be able to purchase EUR reliably while still being able to use currency for domestic transactions in the interim.

== Pricing ==
The relationship between spot and forward is known as the interest rate parity, which states that

$$F = S \left( \frac{1+r_d \cdot T}{1+r_f \cdot T}\right) ,$$

where

- F = forward rate
- S = spot rate
- r_{d} = simple interest rate of the term currency
- r_{f} = simple interest rate of the base currency
- T = tenor (calculated according to the appropriate day count convention)

The forward points or swap points are quoted as the difference between forward and spot, F - S, and is expressed as the following:

$$F - S = S \left( \frac{1+r_d \cdot T}{1+r_f \cdot T} -1 \right) = \frac{S (r_d - r_f) \cdot T}{1+r_f \cdot T} \approx S \left( r_d - r_f \right) T ,$$

if $r_f \cdot T$ is small. Thus, the value of the swap points is roughly proportional to the interest rate differential.

== Related instruments ==
A foreign exchange swap should not be confused with a currency swap, which is a rarer long-term transaction governed by different rules.

== See also ==
- Cross currency swap
- Foreign exchange market
- Forward exchange rate
- Interest rate parity
- Overnight indexed swap
- Rollover (foreign exchange)
