= Foreign exchange derivative =

Financial derivative whose payoff depends on the foreign exchange rates

A foreign exchange derivative is a financial contract whose value changes depending on currency exchange rates.

It is used when people or companies want to:

1. Protect themselves from currency risk (hedging)
2. Earn profit from currency changes (speculation)
3. Make profit from price differences in markets (arbitrage)

== History ==
Foreign exchange transactions can be traced back to the fourteenth Century in England.

The development of foreign exchange derivatives market was in the 1970s with the historical background and economic environment. Firstly, after the collapse of the Bretton Woods system, in 1976, the International Monetary Fund held a meeting in Jamaica and reached the Jamaica agreement. When the floating exchange-rate system replaced a fixed exchange-rate system, many countries relaxed control of interest rates and the risk of financial market increased. In order to reduce and avoid risks and achieve the purpose of hedging, modern financial derivatives were created.

Secondly, economic globalization promoted the globalization of financial activities and financial markets. After the collapse of the Bretton Woods system, there was capital flight across the world. Countries generally relaxed restrictions on domestic and foreign financial institutions and foreign investors. Changes in macroeconomic factors led to market risk and the demand for foreign exchange derivatives market increasing further, what promoted the development of the derivatives market.

Under those circumstances, financial institutions continued to create new financial tools to meet the needs of traders for avoiding the risk. Therefore, many foreign exchange derivatives were widely used, making the foreign exchange market expand from the traditional transactions market to the derivatives market, and developed rapidly during the 1980s and 1990s.(Unknown, 2012）

== Instruments ==
Specific foreign exchange derivatives, and related concepts include:

- Basis swap
- Currency future
- Currency swap
- Foreign exchange binary option
- Foreign exchange forward
- Foreign exchange option
- Foreign exchange swap
- Forward exchange rate
- Non-deliverable forward
- Power reverse dual-currency note

== Margin trading ==
Margin trading which meant traders could pay a small deposit but make full transaction without the practically transferring of your principal. The end of contract mostly adopted the settlement for differences. At the same time, the buyers need not present full payment only when the physical delivery gets performed on the maturity date. Therefore, the characters of trading financial derivatives include the leverage effect. When margin decreases, the risk of trading will increase, as the leverage effect will increase.(Ma Qianli, 2011)

== Basic uses ==
- Avoiding and managing systematic financial risk: Systemic risk can accounts for 50% in the risk when investing in developed countries, so preventing and mitigating systemic financial risks is vital in management by financial institutions. All traditional risk-management tools (insurance, asset-liability management, portfolio etc.) cannot prevent systemic risk, while foreign exchange derivatives can efficiently avoid systemic risk by hedging the currency rates, which is brought by the adverse change of the prices in basic goods market.
- Increasing financial systems’ ability to resist risk: Financial derivatives, which contain functions to avoid and shift risk, can transfer the risk to individuals with more risk tolerance. The process turns financial risk that would be excessive for weak-risk-tolerance companies to withstand to small or intermediate impact for powerful enterprises, while some might be converted to speculators’ chances to make profit. It strengthens financial system’s overall win-resisting ability and consolidates this system’s robustness.
- Improving economic efficiency. It mainly refers to raise the efficiency of business running and financial market: The former is embodied as providing business with tools to prevent the risk of finance, reducing the founding cost and increasing economic benefits. The latter reflected as it enriches and completes financial market system by countless kinds of products, reduces the occurrence of asymmetric information, realizes the desirable arrangement of risk, increases the efficiency in pricing, etc.

== Trading methods ==
- Foreign forward swap transaction trading: The parties of a swap contract agree to periodically swap capital in some time.
- Foreign exchange option trading: The contract can agree the option holder to exchange it at a defined price as his right instead of an obligation.
- Forward exchange futures transaction trading: Future contract’s buyers or sellers submit margin at the beginning of trading, as a kind of buffering mechanism. The margin needs to make corresponding adjustment on time according to the price of contract.
- Forward forex exchange trading: Similar to futures, but it is a non-standardized agreement without the margin requirement.(Lu Lei, 2008)

== Risk and return ==
Foreign exchange derivatives can allow investors to engage in risk avoidance to keep value, but also can earn profit through speculation. This kind of specific duality makes derivatives more uncontrollable. Thus, foreign exchange derivative products can be risky while rewarding.(Chen Qi, 2009) In addition speculative transactions in the financial market are considered negatively and potentially damaging to the real economy.

== See also ==
- Carry trade
- Covered interest arbitrage
- Contract for difference
- Foreign exchange hedge
- Foreign exchange market
- Foreign exchange risk
- Foreign exchange spot
- Interest rate parity
- Rational pricing § Foreign exchange
- Uncovered interest arbitrage
