= Triangular arbitrage =

Forex arbitrage across three currencies

Triangular arbitrage (also referred to as cross currency arbitrage or three-point arbitrage) is the act of exploiting an arbitrage opportunity resulting from a pricing discrepancy among three different currencies in the foreign exchange market. A triangular arbitrage strategy involves three trades, exchanging the initial currency for a second, the second currency for a third, and the third currency for the initial. During the second trade, the arbitrageur locks in a zero-risk profit from the discrepancy that exists when the market cross exchange rate is not aligned with the implicit cross exchange rate. A profitable trade is only possible if there exist market imperfections. Profitable triangular arbitrage is very rarely possible because when such opportunities arise, traders execute trades that take advantage of the imperfections and prices adjust up or down until the opportunity disappears.

== Cross exchange rate discrepancies ==
Triangular arbitrage opportunities may only exist when a bank's quoted exchange rate is not equal to the market's implicit cross exchange rate. The following equation represents the calculation of an implicit cross exchange rate, the exchange rate one would expect in the market as implied from the ratio of two currencies other than the base currency.

$$S_{a/\$} = S_{a/b} S_{b/\$}$$

where

$S_{a/\$}$ is the implicit cross exchange rate for dollars in terms of currency a
$S_{a/b}$ is the quoted market cross exchange rate for b in terms of currency a
$S_{b/\$}$ is the quoted market cross exchange rate for dollars in terms of currency b

If the market cross exchange rate quoted by a bank is equal to the implicit cross exchange rate as implied from the exchange rates of other currencies, then a no-arbitrage condition is sustained. However, if an inequality exists between the market cross exchange rate, $S_{a/\$}$, and the implicit cross exchange rate, $S_{a/b} S_{b/\$}$, then there exists an opportunity for arbitrage profits on the difference between the two exchange rates.

== Mechanics of triangular arbitrage ==
A visual representation of a realistic triangular arbitrage scenario, using sample bid and ask prices quoted by international banks

Some international banks serve as market makers between currencies by narrowing their bid–ask spread more than the bid-ask spread of the implicit cross exchange rate. However, the bid and ask prices of the implicit cross exchange rate naturally discipline market makers. When banks' quoted exchange rates move out of alignment with cross exchange rates, any banks or traders who detect the discrepancy have an opportunity to earn arbitrage profits via a triangular arbitrage strategy. To execute a triangular arbitrage trading strategy, a bank would calculate cross exchange rates and compare them with exchange rates quoted by other banks to identify a pricing discrepancy.

For example, Citibank detects that Deutsche Bank is quoting dollars at a bid price of €0.8171 /$, and that Barclays is quoting pounds at a bid price of $1.4650 /£ (Deutsche Bank and Barclays are in other words willing to buy those currencies at those prices). Citibank itself is quoting the same prices for these two exchange rates. A trader at Citibank then sees that Crédit Agricole is quoting pounds at an ask price of €1.1910 /£ (in other words it is willing to sell pounds at that price). While the quoted market cross exchange rate is €1.1910 /£, Citibank's trader realizes that the implicit cross exchange rate is €1.1971 /£ (by calculating 1.4650 × 0.8171 = 1.1971), meaning that Crédit Agricole has narrowed its bid-ask spread to serve as a market maker between the euro and the pound. Although the market suggests the implicit cross exchange rate should be 1.1971 euros per pound, Crédit Agricole is selling pounds at a lower price of 1.1910 euros. Citibank's trader can hastily exercise triangular arbitrage by exchanging dollars for euros with Deutsche Bank, then exchanging euros for pounds with Crédit Agricole, and finally exchanging pounds for dollars with Barclays. The following steps illustrate the triangular arbitrage transaction.

1. Citibank sells $5,000,000 to Deutsche Bank for euros, receiving €4,085,500. ($5,000,000 × €0.8171 /$ = €4,085,500)
2. Citibank sells €4,085,500 to Crédit Agricole for pounds, receiving £3,430,311. (€4,085,500 ÷ €1.1910 /£ = £3,430,311)
3. Citibank sells £3,430,311 to Barclays for dollars, receiving $5,025,406. (£3,430,311 × $1.4650 /£ = $5,025,406)
4. Citibank ultimately earns an arbitrage profit of $25,406 on the $5,000,000 of capital it used to execute the strategy.

The reason for dividing the euro amount by the euro/pound exchange rate in this example is that the exchange rate is quoted in euro terms, as is the amount being traded. One could multiply the euro amount by the reciprocal pound/euro exchange rate and still calculate the ending amount of pounds.

== Evidence for triangular arbitrage ==
Research examining high-frequency exchange rate data has found that mispricings do occur in the foreign exchange market such that executable triangular arbitrage opportunities appear possible. In observations of triangular arbitrage, the constituent exchange rates have exhibited strong correlation. A study examining exchange rate data provided by HSBC Bank for the Japanese yen (JPY) and the Swiss franc (CHF) found that although a limited number of arbitrage opportunities appeared to exist for as many as 100 seconds, 95% of them lasted for 5 seconds or less, and 60% lasted for 1 second or less. Further, most arbitrage opportunities were found to have small magnitudes, with 94% of JPY and CHF opportunities existing at a difference of 1 basis point, which translates into a potential arbitrage profit of US$100 per US$1 million transacted.

Tests for seasonality in the amount and duration of triangular arbitrage opportunities have shown that incidence of arbitrage opportunities and mean duration is consistent from day to day. However, significant variations have been identified during different times of day. Transactions involving the JPY and CHF have demonstrated a smaller number of opportunities and long average duration around 01:00 and 10:00 UTC, contrasted with a greater number of opportunities and short average duration around 13:00 and 16:00 UTC. Such variations in incidence and duration of arbitrage opportunities can be explained by variations in market liquidity during the trading day. For example, the foreign exchange market is found to be most liquid for Asia around 00:00 and 10:00 UTC, for Europe around 07:00 and 17:00 UTC, and for America around 13:00 and 23:00 UTC. The overall foreign exchange market is most liquid around 08:00 and 16:00 UTC, and the least liquid around 22:00 and 01:00 UTC. The periods of highest liquidity correspond with the periods of greatest incidence of opportunities for triangular arbitrage. This correspondence is substantiated by the observation of narrower bid-ask spreads during periods of high liquidity, resulting in a greater potential for mispricings and therefore arbitrage opportunities. However, market forces are driven to correct for mispricings due to a high frequency of trades that will trade away fleeting arbitrage opportunities.

Researchers have shown a decrease in the incidence of triangular arbitrage opportunities from 2003 to 2005 for the Japanese yen and Swiss franc and have attributed the decrease to broader adoption of electronic trading platforms and trading algorithms during the same period. Such electronic systems have enabled traders to trade and react rapidly to price changes. The speed gained from these technologies improved trading efficiency and the correction of mispricings, allowing for less incidence of triangular arbitrage opportunities.

== Profitability ==
Mere existence of triangular arbitrage opportunities does not necessarily imply that a trading strategy seeking to exploit currency mispricings is consistently profitable. Electronic trading systems allow the three constituent trades in a triangular arbitrage transaction to be submitted very rapidly. However, there exists a delay between the identification of such an opportunity, the initiation of trades, and the arrival of trades to the party quoting the mispricing. Even though such delays are only milliseconds in duration, they are deemed significant. For example, if a trader places each trade as a limit order to be filled only at the arbitrage price and a price moves due to market activity or new price is quoted by the third party, then the triangular transaction will not be completed. In such a case, the arbitrageur will face a cost to close out the position that is equal to the change in price that eliminated the arbitrage condition.

In the foreign exchange market, there are many market participants competing for each arbitrage opportunity; for arbitrage to be profitable, a trader would need to identify and execute each arbitrage opportunity faster than competitors. Competing arbitrageurs are expected to persist in striving to increase their execution speed of trades by engaging in what some researchers describe as an "electronic trading 'arms race'." The costs involved in keeping ahead in such a competition present difficulty in consistently beating other arbitrageurs over the long term. Other factors such as transaction costs, brokerage fees, network access fees, and sophisticated electronic trading platforms further challenge the feasibility of significant arbitrage profits over prolonged periods.

== See also ==
- Covered interest arbitrage
- Uncovered interest arbitrage
- Arbitrage
