= Covered interest arbitrage =

Foreign exchange market

Covered interest arbitrage is an arbitrage trading strategy whereby an investor capitalizes on the interest rate differential between two countries by using a forward contract to cover (eliminate exposure to) exchange rate risk. Using forward contracts enables arbitrageurs such as individual investors or banks to make use of the forward premium (or discount) to earn a riskless profit from discrepancies between two countries' interest rates. The opportunity to earn riskless profits arises from the reality that the interest rate parity condition does not constantly hold. When spot and forward exchange rate markets are not in a state of equilibrium, investors will no longer be indifferent among the available interest rates in two countries and will invest in whichever currency offers a higher rate of return. Economists have discovered various factors which affect the occurrence of deviations from covered interest rate parity and the fleeting nature of covered interest arbitrage opportunities, such as differing characteristics of assets, varying frequencies of time series data, and the transaction costs associated with arbitrage trading strategies.

== Mechanics of covered interest arbitrage ==
A visual representation of a simplified covered interest arbitrage scenario, ignoring compounding interest. In this numerical example the arbitrageur is guaranteed to do better than would be achieved by investing domestically.

An arbitrageur executes a covered interest arbitrage strategy by exchanging domestic currency for foreign currency at the current spot exchange rate, then investing the foreign currency at the foreign interest rate. Simultaneously, the arbitrageur negotiates a forward contract to sell the amount of the future value of the foreign investment at a delivery date consistent with the foreign investment's maturity date, to receive domestic currency in exchange for the foreign-currency funds.

For example, as per the chart at right consider that an investor with US$5,000,000 is considering whether to invest abroad using a covered interest arbitrage strategy or to invest domestically. The dollar deposit interest rate is 3.4% in the United States, while the euro deposit rate is 4.6% in the euro area. The current spot exchange rate is 1.2730 $/€ and the six-month forward exchange rate is 1.3000 $/€. For simplicity, the example ignores compounding interest. Investing US$5,000,000 domestically at 3.4% for six months ignoring compounding, will result in a future value of US$5,085,000. However, exchanging $5,000,000 for euros today, investing those euros at 4.6% for six months ignoring compounding, and exchanging the future value of euros for dollars at the forward exchange rate (on the delivery date negotiated in the forward contract), will result in US$5,223,488, implying that investing abroad using covered interest arbitrage is the superior alternative.

== Effect of arbitrage ==
If there were no impediments, such as transaction costs, to covered interest arbitrage, then any opportunity, however minuscule, to profit from it would immediately be exploited by many financial market participants, and the resulting pressure on domestic and forward interest rates and the forward exchange rate premium would cause one or more of these to change virtually instantaneously to eliminate the opportunity. In fact, the anticipation of such arbitrage leading to such market changes would cause these three variables to align to prevent any arbitrage opportunities from even arising in the first place: incipient arbitrage can have the same effect, but sooner, as actual arbitrage. Thus, any evidence of empirical deviations from covered interest parity would have to be explained on the grounds of some friction in the financial markets.

== Evidence for covered interest arbitrage opportunities ==
Economists Robert M. Dunn, Jr. and John H. Mutti note that financial markets may generate data inconsistent with interest rate parity, and that cases in which significant covered interest arbitrage profits appeared feasible were often due to assets not sharing the same perceptions of risk, the potential for double taxation due to differing policies, and investors' concerns over the imposition of foreign exchange controls cumbersome to the enforcement of forward contracts. Some covered interest arbitrage opportunities have appeared to exist when exchange rates and interest rates were collected for different periods; for example, the use of daily interest rates and daily closing exchange rates could render the illusion that arbitrage profits exist. Economists have suggested an array of other factors to account for observed deviations from interest rate parity, such as differing tax treatment, differing risks, government foreign exchange controls, supply or demand inelasticity, transaction costs, and time differentials between observing and executing arbitrage opportunities. Economists Jacob Frenkel and Richard M. Levich investigated the performance of covered interest arbitrage strategies during the 1970s' flexible exchange rate regime by examining transaction costs and differentials between observing and executing arbitrage opportunities. Using weekly data, they estimated transaction costs and evaluated their role in explaining deviations from interest rate parity and found that most deviations could be explained by transaction costs. However, accommodating transaction costs did not explain observed deviations from covered interest rate parity between treasury bills in the United States and the United Kingdom. Frenkel and Levich found that executing such transactions resulted in only illusory opportunities for arbitrage profits, and that in each execution the mean percentage of profit decreased such that there was no statistically significant difference from zero profitability. Frenkel and Levich concluded that unexploited opportunities for profit do not exist in covered interest arbitrage.

Using a time series dataset of daily spot and forward USD/JPY exchange rates and same-maturity short-term interest rates in both the United States and Japan, economists Johnathan A. Batten and Peter G. Szilagyi analyzed the sensitivity of forward market price differentials to short-term interest rate differentials. The researchers found evidence for substantial variation in covered interest rate parity deviations from equilibrium, attributed to transaction costs and market segmentation. They found that such deviations and arbitrage opportunities diminished significantly nearly to a point of elimination by the year 2000. Batten and Szilagyi point out that the modern reliance on electronic trading platforms and real-time equilibrium prices appear to account for the removal of the historical scale and scope of covered interest arbitrage opportunities. Further investigation of the deviations uncovered a long-term dependence, found to be consistent with other evidence of temporal long-term dependencies identified in asset returns from other financial markets including currencies, stocks, and commodities.

Economists Wai-Ming Fong, Giorgio Valente, and Joseph K.W. Fung, examined the relationship of covered interest rate parity arbitrage opportunities with market liquidity and credit risk using a dataset of tick-by-tick spot and forward exchange rate quotes for the Hong Kong dollar in relation to the United States dollar. Their empirical analysis demonstrates that positive deviations from covered interest rate parity indeed compensate for liquidity and credit risk. After accounting for these risk premia, the researchers demonstrated that small residual arbitrage profits accrue only to those arbitrageurs capable of negotiating low transaction costs.

== See also ==
- Uncovered interest arbitrage
- Foreign exchange derivative
- Rational pricing § Foreign exchange
