= Privatized foreign currency risk =

Privatization of foreign currency risk, also known as foreign currency risk privatization, is a financial system established under at the Bretton Woods Conference in which foreign exchange risk was borne by the public sector, but when it collapsed, risk was privatized, as exchange rates are able to fluctuate freely.

In the scheme, exchange rates cannot be held constant by central banks, leading to currency risk possibilities where a currency loses or gains in value when converted to another currency. To reduce risk, firms trading in foreign markets needed to be able to change their mix of currencies and assets held in the present and future in line with the changing perception of foreign exchange risk (Ee). The new international financial system is highly liquid, volatile, contagion prone, has huge volumes, and is ever expanding.
