= Uncovered interest arbitrage =

Trading strategy

Uncovered interest arbitrage is an arbitrage trading strategy whereby an investor capitalizes on the interest rate differential between two countries. Unlike covered interest arbitrage, uncovered interest arbitrage involves no hedging of foreign exchange risk with the use of forward contracts or any other contract. The strategy involves risk, as an investor exposed to exchange rate fluctuations is speculating that exchange rates will remain favorable enough for arbitrage to be profitable. The opportunity to earn profits arises from the reality that the uncovered interest rate parity condition does not constantly hold—that is, the interest rate on investments in one country's currency does not always equal the interest rate on foreign-currency investments plus the rate of appreciation that is expected for the foreign currency relative to the domestic currency. When a discrepancy between these occurs, investors who are willing to take on risk will not be indifferent between the two possible locations of investment, and will invest in whichever currency is expected to offer a higher rate of return including currency exchange gains or losses (perhaps adjusted for a risk premium).

== Mechanics of uncovered interest arbitrage ==
A visual representation of a simplified uncovered interest arbitrage scenario, ignoring compounding interest.

An arbitrageur executes an uncovered interest arbitrage strategy by exchanging domestic currency for foreign currency at the current spot exchange rate, then investing the foreign currency at the foreign interest rate, and at the end of the investment term using the spot foreign exchange market to convert back to the original currency. The risk arises from the fact that the future spot exchange rate for the currencies is not known with certainty when the strategy is chosen.

For example, consider that an investor with US$5,000,000 is considering whether to invest abroad using an uncovered interest arbitrage strategy or to invest domestically. The dollar deposit interest rate is 3.4% in the United States, while the euro deposit rate is 4.6% in the euro area. The current spot exchange rate is 1.2730 $/€. For simplicity, the example ignores compounding interest. Investing US$5,000,000 domestically at 3.4% for six months ignoring compounding, will result in a future value of US$5,170,000. However, exchanging US$5,000,000 for euros today, investing those euros at 4.6% for six months ignoring compounding, and exchanging the future value of euros for dollars at the future spot exchange rate (which for this example is 1.2820 $/€), will result in US$5,266,976, implying that investing abroad using uncovered interest arbitrage is the superior alternative if the future spot exchange rate turns out to be favorable.

== See also ==
- Financial crisis
- Fixed income arbitrage
- Rational pricing
