= Currency adjustment factor =

Fee added to freight charges to reflect currency value changes

A currency adjustment factor (CAF) is a fee placed on top of freighting charges for carrier companies developed to account for constantly changing exchange rates between the dollar and other currencies. Its goal is to offset any losses from fluctuating exchange rates for carriers. Calculation basis and methodology may vary from carrier to carrier.

== Overview ==
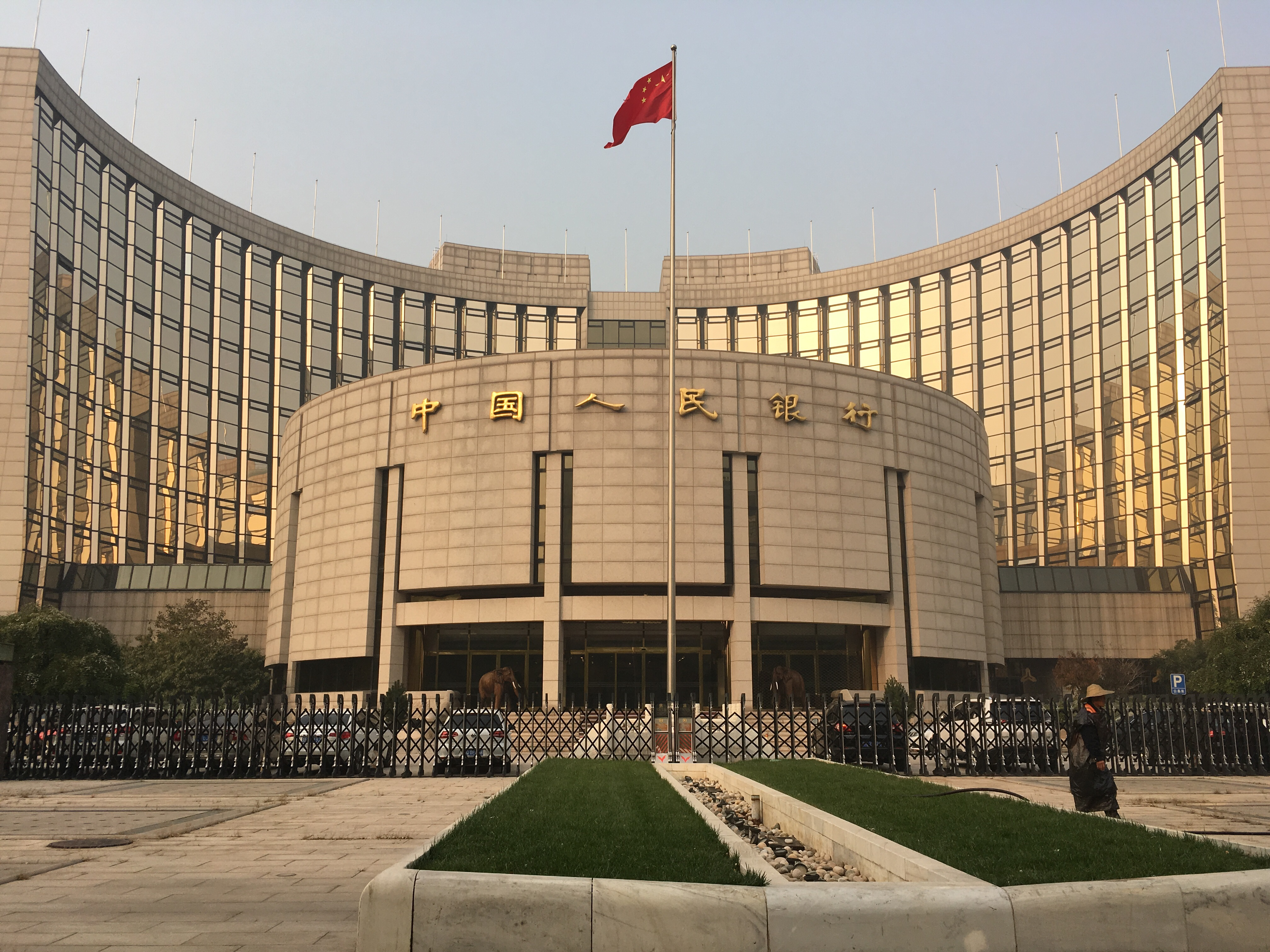
People's Bank of China Headquarters in Beijing

The CAF increases as the US dollar decreases. It is applied as a percentage on top of the base exchange rate, which is calculated as the average exchange rate for the previous three months. Due to this added charge, shippers tend to enter into "all inclusive" contracts at one price that accounts for all applicable charges, to limit the effect of the CAF. In 2005, the CAF charged on shipments to Japan was 51%.

On 21 July 2005, the People's Bank of China announced that it would no longer peg the Chinese currency (renminbi or RMB) to the United States dollar (USD). In response a number of international freight forwarders decided to convert all their contracts with their customers into renminbi and to introduce a CAF surcharge. The freight businesses agreed to set the CAF amount; the European Commission held that this agreement between competing companies amounted to a cartel and fined the businesses in 2012; this decision and decisions regarding a number of other freight cartels were upheld by the Court of Justice of the European Union on 1 February 2018.

== See also ==
- Commodity currency
