= Interest rate parity =

No-arbitrage equilibrium state

Interest rate parity is a no-arbitrage condition representing an equilibrium state under which investors compare interest rates available on bank deposits in two countries. The fact that this condition does not always hold allows for potential opportunities to earn riskless profits from covered interest arbitrage. Two assumptions central to interest rate parity are capital mobility and perfect substitutability of domestic and foreign assets. Given foreign exchange market equilibrium, the interest rate parity condition implies that the expected return on domestic assets will equal the exchange rate-adjusted expected return on foreign currency assets. Investors then cannot earn arbitrage profits by borrowing in a country with a lower interest rate, exchanging for foreign currency, and investing in a foreign country with a higher interest rate, due to gains or losses from exchanging back to their domestic currency at maturity. Interest rate parity takes on two distinctive forms: uncovered interest rate parity refers to the parity condition in which exposure to foreign exchange risk (unanticipated changes in exchange rates) is uninhibited, whereas covered interest rate parity refers to the condition in which a forward contract has been used to cover (eliminate exposure to) exchange rate risk. Each form of the parity condition demonstrates a unique relationship with implications for the forecasting of future exchange rates: the forward exchange rate and the future spot exchange rate.

Economists have found empirical evidence that covered interest rate parity generally holds, though not with precision due to the effects of various risks, costs, taxation, and ultimate differences in liquidity. When both covered and uncovered interest rate parity hold, they expose a relationship suggesting that the forward rate is an unbiased predictor of the future spot rate. This relationship can be employed to test whether uncovered interest rate parity holds, for which economists have found mixed results. When uncovered interest rate parity and purchasing power parity hold together, they illuminate a relationship named real interest rate parity, which suggests that expected real interest rates represent expected adjustments in the real exchange rate. This relationship generally holds strongly over longer terms and among emerging market countries.

== Assumptions ==
Interest rate parity rests on certain assumptions, the first being that capital is mobile – investors can readily exchange domestic assets for foreign assets. The second assumption is that assets have perfect substitutability, following from their similarities in riskiness and liquidity. Given capital mobility and perfect substitutability, investors would be expected to hold those assets offering greater returns, be they domestic or foreign assets. However, both domestic and foreign assets are held by investors. Therefore, it must be true that no difference can exist between the returns on domestic assets and the returns on foreign assets. That is not to say that domestic investors and foreign investors will earn equivalent returns, but that a single investor on any given side would expect to earn equivalent returns from either investment decision.

== Uncovered interest rate parity ==
A visual representation of uncovered interest rate parity holding in the foreign exchange market, such that the returns from investing domestically are equal to the returns from investing abroad

When the no-arbitrage condition is satisfied without the use of a forward contract to hedge against exposure to exchange rate risk, interest rate parity is said to be uncovered. Risk-neutral investors will be indifferent among the available interest rates in two countries because the exchange rate between those countries is expected to adjust such that the dollar return on dollar deposits is equal to the dollar return on euro deposits, thereby eliminating the potential for uncovered interest arbitrage profits. Uncovered interest rate parity helps explain the determination of the spot exchange rate. The following equation represents uncovered interest rate parity.

$$(1 + i_\$) = \frac {E_t(S_{t + k})} {S_t} (1 + i_c)$$

where

$E_t(S_{t + k})$ is the expected future spot exchange rate at time t + k
k is the number of periods into the future from time t
S_{t} is the current spot exchange rate at time t
i_{$} is the interest rate in one country (for example, the United States)
i_{c} is the interest rate in another country or currency area (for example, the Eurozone)

The dollar return on dollar deposits, $1 + i_\$$, is shown to be equal to the dollar return on euro deposits, $\frac {E_t(S_{t + k})} {S_t} (1 + i_c)$.

=== Approximation ===
Uncovered interest rate parity asserts that an investor with dollar deposits will earn the interest rate available on dollar deposits, while an investor holding euro deposits will earn the interest rate available in the eurozone, but also a potential gain or loss on euros depending on the rate of appreciation or depreciation of the euro against the dollar. Economists have extrapolated a useful approximation of uncovered interest rate parity that follows intuitively from these assumptions. If uncovered interest rate parity holds, such that an investor is indifferent between dollar versus euro deposits, then any excess return on euro deposits must be offset by some expected loss from depreciation of the euro against the dollar. Conversely, some shortfall in return on euro deposits must be offset by some expected gain from appreciation of the euro against the dollar. The following equation represents the uncovered interest rate parity approximation.

$$i_\$ = i_c + \frac {{\Delta}E_t(S_{t + k})} {S_t}$$

where

${{\Delta}E_t(S_{t + k})}$ is the change in the expected future spot exchange rate
${{\Delta}E_t(S_{t + k})} / {S_t}$ is the expected rate of depreciation (or appreciation) of the dollar

A more universal way of stating the approximation is "the home interest rate equals the foreign interest rate plus the expected rate of depreciation of the home currency."

== Covered interest rate parity ==
A visual representation of covered interest rate parity holding in the foreign exchange market, such that the returns from investing domestically are equal to the returns from investing abroad

When the no-arbitrage condition is satisfied with the use of a forward contract to hedge against exposure to exchange rate risk, interest rate parity is said to be covered. Investors will still be indifferent among the available interest rates in two countries because the forward exchange rate sustains equilibrium such that the dollar return on dollar deposits is equal to the dollar return on foreign deposit, thereby eliminating the potential for covered interest arbitrage profits. Furthermore, covered interest rate parity helps explain the determination of the forward exchange rate. The following equation represents covered interest rate parity.

$$(1 + i_\$) = \frac {F_t} {S_t} (1 + i_c)$$

where

$F_t$ is the forward exchange rate at time t

The dollar return on dollar deposits, $1 + i_\$$, is shown to be equal to the dollar return on euro deposits, $\frac {F_t} {S_t} (1 + i_c)$.

== Empirical evidence ==
Traditionally, covered interest rate parity (CIRP) was found to hold when there is open capital mobility and limited capital controls, and this finding is confirmed for all currencies freely traded in the present day. One such example is when the United Kingdom and Germany abolished capital controls between 1979 and 1981. Maurice Obstfeld and Alan Taylor calculated hypothetical profits as implied by the expression of a potential inequality in the CIRP equation (meaning a difference in returns on domestic versus foreign assets) during the 1960s and 1970s, which would have constituted arbitrage opportunities if not for the prevalence of capital controls. However, given financial liberalization and resulting capital mobility, arbitrage temporarily became possible until equilibrium was restored. Since the abolition of capital controls in the United Kingdom and Germany, potential arbitrage profits have been near zero. Factoring in transaction costs arising from fees and other regulations, arbitrage opportunities are fleeting or nonexistent when such costs exceed deviations from parity. While CIRP generally holds, it does not hold with precision due to the presence of transaction costs, political risks, tax implications for interest earnings versus gains from foreign exchange, and differences in the liquidity of domestic versus foreign assets.

When Covered Interest Parity holds strongly, which is generally the case under full capital account convertibility, then the forward discount on the exchange rate, denoted as F, will equal the nominal interest rate differential (denoted as R minus R*). Taylor (1987) study based on data with actual trades showed that Covered Interest Parity was holding.

However, for Uncovered Interest Parity to hold the forward rate must be an unbiased predictor of the future (i.e. next period) spot exchange rate. Then the Ordinary Least Squares regression of the change in the spot rate on an intercept and the interest rate differential (R minus R*) provides a good test of UIP. The intercept should be zero and the coefficient on (R minus R*) should not be significantly different from unity. However for three major currency pairs U.S. $/yen, $/deutschemark and $/pound for the above period with over 150 monthly observations, McCallum (1996) found that the estimated coefficient on R minus R*was not just less than one, but it was hugely negative (– 4.2 for mark, – 3.3 for yen and – 4.7 for pound) and significant at the 1% level. In other words, the country with a higher interest rate had an appreciating currency. That is a huge violation of UIP. Explaining it is another matter.

Researchers found evidence that significant deviations from CIRP during the onset of the 2008 financial crisis were driven by concerns over risk posed by counter parties to banks and financial institutions in Europe and the US in the foreign exchange swap market. The European Central Bank's efforts to provide US dollar liquidity in the foreign exchange swap market, along with similar efforts by the Federal Reserve, had a moderating impact on CIRP deviations between the dollar and the euro. Such a scenario was found to be reminiscent of deviations from CIRP during the 1990s driven by struggling Japanese banks which looked toward foreign exchange swap markets to try and acquire dollars to bolster their creditworthiness. A second period of deviations from CIRP after 2012, at a time of relatively calm markets, led to renewed debate about the extent and origin of deviations from CIRP. Explanations include intermediary constraints that can lead to limits to arbitrage, such as balance sheet costs of arbitrage, raised by a team of researchers at the Bank for International Settlements. Other explanations question common assumptions underlying the CIRP condition, such as the choice of discount factors. Deviations from CIRP remain subject to ongoing debate.

When both covered and uncovered interest rate parity (UIRP) hold, such a condition sheds light on a noteworthy relationship between the forward and expected future spot exchange rates, as demonstrated below.

$$UIRP: (1 + i_\$) = \frac {E_t(S_{t + k})} {S_t} (1 + i_c)$$

$$CIRP: (1 + i_\$) = \frac {F_t} {S_t} (1 + i_c)$$

Dividing the equation for UIRP by the equation for CIRP yields the following equation:

$$1 = \frac {E_t(S_{t + k})} {F_t}$$

which can be rewritten as:

$${F_t} = E_t(S_{t + k})$$

This equation represents the unbiasedness hypothesis, which states that the forward exchange rate is an unbiased predictor of the future spot exchange rate. Given strong evidence that CIRP holds, the forward rate unbiasedness hypothesis can serve as a test to determine whether UIRP holds (in order for the forward rate and expected spot rate to be equal, both CIRP and UIRP conditions must hold). Evidence for the validity and accuracy of the unbiasedness hypothesis, particularly evidence for cointegration between the forward rate and future spot rate, is mixed as researchers have published numerous papers demonstrating both empirical support and empirical failure of the hypothesis.

UIRP is found to have some empirical support in tests for correlation between expected rates of currency depreciation and the forward premium or discount. Evidence suggests that whether UIRP holds depends on the currency examined, and deviations from UIRP have been found to be less substantial when examining longer time horizons. Some studies of monetary policy have offered explanations for why UIRP fails empirically. Researchers demonstrated that if a central bank manages interest rate spreads in strong response to the previous period's spreads, that interest rate spreads had negative coefficients in regression tests of UIRP. Another study which set up a model wherein the central bank's monetary policy responds to exogenous shocks, that the central bank's smoothing of interest rates can explain empirical failures of UIRP.

A study of central bank interventions on the US dollar and Deutsche mark found only limited evidence of any substantial effect on deviations from UIRP. UIRP has been found to hold over very small spans of time (covering only a number of hours) with a high frequency of bilateral exchange rate data. Tests of UIRP for economies experiencing institutional regime changes, using monthly exchange rate data for the US dollar versus the Deutsche mark and the Spanish peseta versus the British pound, have found some evidence that UIRP held when US and German regime changes were volatile, and held between Spain and the United Kingdom particularly after Spain joined the European Union in 1986 and began liberalizing capital mobility.

== Real interest rate parity ==
When both UIRP (particularly in its approximation form) and purchasing power parity (PPP) hold, the two parity conditions together reveal a relationship among expected real interest rates, wherein changes in expected real interest rates reflect expected changes in the real exchange rate. This condition is known as real interest rate parity (RIRP) and is related to the international Fisher effect. The following equations demonstrate how to derive the RIRP equation.

$$UIRP: {\Delta}E_t(S_{t + k}) / S_t = (E_t(S_{t + k}) - S_t) / S_t = i_\$ - i_c$$

$$PPP: {\Delta}E_t(S_{t + k}) / S_t = E_t({p^\$}_{t + k}) - E_t({p^c}_{t + k})$$

where

$p$ represents inflation

If the above conditions hold, then they can be combined and rearranged as the following:

$$RIRP: i_\$ - E_t({p^\$}_{t + k}) = i_c - E_t({p^c}_{t + k})$$

RIRP rests on several assumptions, including efficient markets, no country risk premia, and zero change in the expected real exchange rate. The parity condition suggests that real interest rates will equalize between countries and that capital mobility will result in capital flows that eliminate opportunities for arbitrage. There exists strong evidence that RIRP holds tightly among emerging markets in Asia and also Japan. The half-life period of deviations from RIRP have been examined by researchers and found to be roughly six or seven months, but between two and three months for certain countries. Such variation in the half-lives of deviations may be reflective of differences in the degree of financial integration among the country groups analyzed. RIRP does not hold over short time horizons, but empirical evidence has demonstrated that it generally holds well across long time horizons of five to ten years.

== See also ==
- Carry trade
- Covered interest arbitrage
- Financial crisis
- Foreign exchange derivative
- Uncovered interest arbitrage
- Rational pricing § Foreign exchange
