= Forward market =

Informal financial market

The forward market is the informal over-the-counter financial market by which contracts for future delivery are entered into. It is mainly used for trading in foreign currencies, where the contracts are used to hedge against foreign exchange risk. Commodities are also traded on forward markets. Examples include agricultural products such as rice, and energy futures, such as oil and natural gas. Transactions on a forward market are typically not standardized, and contracts are customised to the needs of the trading parties. In contrast, standardized forward contracts are called futures contracts and traded on a futures exchange.

== Counterparty and settlement risk ==
Because forward contracts are usually traded over the counter, the parties can agree terms such as the amount, delivery date, and settlement method directly with each other. This flexibility also means that the contract is not necessarily standardised or guaranteed by an exchange clearing house. The Commodity Futures Trading Commission notes that forward contracts expose each party to the risk that the counterparty may default, while exchange-traded futures are guaranteed against default by a clearing organisation.

In foreign exchange markets, forward transactions can also involve settlement risk. The Basel Committee on Banking Supervision describes an FX forward as an agreement to buy or sell one currency against another at a future date and agreed rate, and notes that foreign exchange transactions may give rise to risks such as principal risk, replacement cost risk, and liquidity risk.

== See also ==
- Forward exchange market
