= Forward exchange rate =

Exchange rate of a currency on a future date

The forward exchange rate (also sometimes referred to as forward rate or forward price) is the exchange rate at which two counterparties (such as a bank and an investor) agree to exchange one currency for another at a future date when they enter into a forward contract. Multinational corporations, banks, and other financial institutions enter into forward contracts to take advantage of the forward rate for hedging purposes. The forward exchange rate is determined by a parity relationship among the spot exchange rate and differences in interest rates between two countries, which reflects an economic equilibrium in the foreign exchange market under which arbitrage opportunities are eliminated. When in equilibrium, and when interest rates vary across two countries, the parity condition implies that the forward rate includes a premium or discount reflecting the interest rate differential. Forward exchange rates have important theoretical implications for forecasting future spot exchange rates. Financial economists have put forth a hypothesis that the forward rate accurately predicts the future spot rate, for which empirical evidence is mixed.

== Introduction ==
The forward exchange rate is the rate at which a commercial bank is willing to commit to exchange one currency for another at some specified future date. The forward exchange rate is a type of forward price. It is the exchange rate negotiated today between a bank and a client upon entering into a forward contract agreeing to buy or sell some amount of foreign currency in the future. Multinational corporations and financial institutions often use the forward market to hedge future payables or receivables denominated in a foreign currency against foreign exchange risk by using a forward contract to lock in a forward exchange rate. Hedging with forward contracts is typically used for larger transactions, while futures contracts are used for smaller transactions. This is due to the customization afforded to banks by forward contracts traded over-the-counter, versus the standardization of futures contracts which are traded on an exchange. Banks typically quote forward rates for major currencies in maturities of one, three, six, nine, or twelve months, however in some cases quotations for greater maturities are available up to five or ten years.

== Relation to covered interest rate parity ==
Covered interest rate parity is a no-arbitrage condition in foreign exchange markets which depends on the availability of the forward market. It can be rearranged to give the forward exchange rate as a function of the other variables. The forward exchange rate depends on three known variables: the spot exchange rate, the domestic interest rate, and the foreign interest rate. This effectively means that the forward rate is the price of a forward contract, which derives its value from the pricing of spot contracts and the addition of information on available interest rates.

The following equation represents covered interest rate parity, a condition under which investors eliminate exposure to foreign exchange risk (unanticipated changes in exchange rates) with the use of a forward contract – the exchange rate risk is effectively covered. Under this condition, a domestic investor would earn equal returns from investing in domestic assets or converting currency at the spot exchange rate, investing in foreign currency assets in a country with a different interest rate, and exchanging the foreign currency for domestic currency at the negotiated forward exchange rate. Investors will be indifferent to the interest rates on deposits in these countries due to the equilibrium resulting from the forward exchange rate. The condition allows for no arbitrage opportunities because the return on domestic deposits, 1+i_{d}, is equal to the return on foreign deposits, [F/S](1+i_{f}). If these two returns weren't equalized by the use of a forward contract, there would be a potential arbitrage opportunity in which, for example, an investor could borrow currency in the country with the lower interest rate, convert to the foreign currency at today's spot exchange rate, and invest in the foreign country with the higher interest rate.

$$(1+i_d) = \frac {F} S (1+i_f)$$

where

F is the forward exchange rate
S is the current spot exchange rate
i_{d} is the interest rate in domestic currency (base currency)
i_{f} is the interest rate in foreign currency (quoted currency)

This equation can be arranged such that it solves for the forward rate:

$$F = S \frac {(1+i_d)} {(1+i_f)}$$

== Forward premium or discount ==
The equilibrium that results from the relationship between forward and spot exchange rates within the context of covered interest rate parity is responsible for eliminating or correcting for market inefficiencies that would create potential for arbitrage profits. As such, arbitrage opportunities are fleeting. In order for this equilibrium to hold under differences in interest rates between two countries, the forward exchange rate must generally differ from the spot exchange rate, such that a no-arbitrage condition is sustained. Therefore, the forward rate is said to contain a premium or discount, reflecting the interest rate differential between two countries. The following equations demonstrate how the forward premium or discount is calculated.

The forward exchange rate differs by a premium or discount of the spot exchange rate:

$$F = S(1 + P)$$

where

P is the premium (if positive) or discount (if negative)

The equation can be rearranged as follows to solve for the forward premium/discount:

$$P = \frac {F} S - 1$$

In practice, forward premiums and discounts are quoted as annualized percentage deviations from the spot exchange rate, in which case it is necessary to account for the number of days to delivery as in the following example.

$$P_N = \left(\frac {F} S - 1\right) \frac {360} d$$

where

N represents the maturity of a given forward exchange rate quote
d represents the number of days to delivery

For example, to calculate the 6-month forward premium or discount for the euro versus the dollar deliverable in 30 days, given a spot rate quote of $1.2238/€ and a 6-month forward rate quote of $1.2260/€:

$$P_6 = \left(\frac {1.2260} {1.2238} - 1\right) \frac {360} {30} = 0.021572 = 2.16\%$$

The resulting 0.021572 is positive, so one would say that the euro is trading at a 0.021572 or 2.16% premium against the dollar for delivery in 30 days. Conversely, if one were to work this example in euro terms rather than dollar terms, the perspective would be reversed and one would say that the dollar is trading at a discount against the Euro.

== Forecasting future spot exchange rates ==
=== Unbiasedness hypothesis ===
The unbiasedness hypothesis states that given conditions of rational expectations and risk neutrality, the forward exchange rate is an unbiased predictor of the future spot exchange rate. Without introducing a foreign exchange risk premium (due to the assumption of risk neutrality), the following equation illustrates the unbiasedness hypothesis.

$$F_t = E_t(S_{t + k})$$

where

$F_t$ is the forward exchange rate at time t
$E_t(S_{t + k})$ is the expected future spot exchange rate at time t + k
k is the number of periods into the future from time t

The empirical rejection of the unbiasedness hypothesis is a well-recognized puzzle among finance researchers. Empirical evidence for cointegration between the forward rate and the future spot rate is mixed. Researchers have published papers demonstrating empirical failure of the hypothesis by conducting regression analyses of the realized changes in spot exchange rates on forward premiums and finding negative slope coefficients. These researchers offer numerous rationales for such failure. One rationale centers around the relaxation of risk neutrality, while still assuming rational expectations, such that a foreign exchange risk premium may exist that can account for differences between the forward rate and the future spot rate.

The following equation represents the forward rate as being equal to a future spot rate and a risk premium (not to be confused with a forward premium):

$$F_t = E_t(S_{t + 1}) + P_t$$

The current spot rate can be introduced so that the equation solves for the forward-spot differential (the difference between the forward rate and the current spot rate):

$$F_t - S_t = E_t(S_{t + 1} - S_t) + P_t$$

Eugene Fama concluded that large positive correlations of the difference between the forward exchange rate and the current spot exchange rate signal variations over time in the premium component of the forward-spot differential $F_t - S_t$ or in the forecast of the expected change in the spot exchange rate. Fama suggested that slope coefficients in the regressions of the difference between the forward rate and the future spot rate $F_t - S_{t + 1}$, and the expected change in the spot rate $E_t(S_{t + 1} - S_t)$, on the forward-spot differential $F_t - S_t$ which are different from zero imply variations over time in both components of the forward-spot differential: the premium and the expected change in the spot rate. Fama's findings were sought to be empirically validated by a significant body of research, ultimately finding that large variance in expected changes in the spot rate could only be accounted for by risk aversion coefficients that were deemed "unacceptably high." Other researchers have found that the unbiasedness hypothesis has been rejected in both cases where there is evidence of risk premia varying over time and cases where risk premia are constant.

Other rationales for the failure of the forward rate unbiasedness hypothesis include considering the conditional bias to be an exogenous variable explained by a policy aimed at smoothing interest rates and stabilizing exchange rates, or considering that an economy allowing for discrete changes could facilitate excess returns in the forward market. Some researchers have contested empirical failures of the hypothesis and have sought to explain conflicting evidence as resulting from contaminated data and even inappropriate selections of the time length of forward contracts. Economists demonstrated that the forward rate could serve as a useful proxy for future spot exchange rates between currencies with liquidity premia that average out to zero during the onset of floating exchange rate regimes in the 1970s. Research examining the introduction of endogenous breaks to test the structural stability of cointegrated spot and forward exchange rate time series have found some evidence to support forward rate unbiasedness in both the short and long term.

== Forward exchange contract ==
A forward exchange contract is identified as an agreement that is made between two parties with an intention of exchanging two different currencies at a specific time in the future. In this situation, a business makes an agreement to buy a given quantity of foreign currency in the future with a prearranged fixed exchange rate (Walmsley, 2000). The move enables the parties that are involved in the transaction to better their future and budget for their financial projects. Effective budgeting is facilitated by effective understanding about the future transactions' specific exchange rate and transaction period. Forward exchange rates are created to protect parties engaging in a business from unexpected adverse financial conditions due to fluctuations on the currency exchange market. Commonly, a forward exchange rate is usually made for twelve months into the future where the major world currencies are used (Ltd, (2017). Here, the currencies that are commonly used include the Swiss Franc, the Euro, US dollar, Japanese yen, and the British pound. Forward exchange contracts are entered into mainly for speculation or hedging purposes.

The use of forward contracts is mainly applied by any business that is either selling or buying a foreign currency that may be interested in managing the risks that are associated with the currency fluctuations. Through the use of the method, such a business can ease the effect of those variations of the cash flows and the stated incomes of the business entity. The risk can be avoided by making an arrangement with a business entity to sell or buy the foreign currency at a specific future date at an approved rate (Walmsley, 2000). Here, both parties are required to match the date that the currency is anticipated to be received. These arrangements are made through the bank where each contract is associated with a specific transaction or sometimes use a number of contracts to cover a pool of transactions (Parameswaran, 2011).

Based on the SSAP 20 in the UK GAAP, the foreign currency translation that provides the option of translating a transaction at the prevailing rate at the date the transaction happened then a matching forward contract rate should be created. In a situation where the forward rate is used, then no losses of exchange gains should be recognized in the books of accounts when both parties are recording the sale and eventual settlement (Parameswaran, 2011).

In this situation recording the transaction between Pamela and Tommy

Date

Date of Currency exchange rate	Spot exchange rate	Forward contract exchange rate
1.25	1.27	1.26

Here, assuming that Pamela applies the forward rate of translation the accounting entries will be as follows

                                                                                                          DR (£)             CR (£)

Debtors 3,968,254

Sales 3,968,254

To record the sale of 5 million euros at the forward rate of $1.26 = $1 U.S dollar.

After the end of the first month on the balance sheet date, no transaction with the debtor is recorded since the forward rate has been used. At the end of the agreed period, the journals that will be recorded to recognise receiving of the sales money will be as follows

As at the date of settlement

                                                                                              DR (£)                         CR (£)

Cash 3,968,254

Debtors 3,968,254

To record the receipt of 5 million euros at the forward rate of $1.26 = $1 U.S. dollar.

In this transaction, there is no difference that arises as the sale of goods in a foreign currency and forward contract are effectively treated as one transaction. Here the rate of $1.26 = $1 U.S dollar is used throughout the recording of both transactions.

Accounting Treatment under the FRS 102

The FRS accounting procedure takes a different route of execution in treating the sale and the forward contract as two separate transactions

According to section 30 of foreign currency translation, foreign exchange transaction should be recorded at the spot rate. The transactions are also recorded at the date of the transaction while the monetary items should be treated by translating them through the use of a closing rate at the balance sheet date. In this case, there is no use of a forward rate since any exchanges that arise at the balance sheet data on the settlements are recognised as either a profit or a loss (Ltd, 2017).

However, the forward currency contracts are then recorded as other financial instruments as per the classification of FRS 102 and therefore accounted for in accordance with section 12 of other financial instruments (Parameswaran, 2011). Additionally, section 12 requires that the derivative contract to be recognised at the fair value, this is the section where the initial value should be recognised in the journal entries. Any changes that should appear in the fair value, it should be recognised as either a loss or a profit. Lastly, in a situation where the foreign currency contracts are part of a qualifying hedging arrangement, then they should be accounted as per the hedge accounting rules (Parameswaran, 2011).

Using the provided information the accounting journal entries should be as follows;

As at the date of the transaction

                                                                                              DR (£)                         CR (£)

Debtors 3,937,007

Sales 3,937,007

To record the sale of 5 million euros at the spot rate of $1.27 = $1 U.S. dollar.

Here, there are no accounting entries for the forward foreign currency contract since its fair value is zero.

                                                                                              DR (£)                         CR(£)

Debtors 4,000,000

Sales 4,000,000

To record the sale of 5 million euros at the spot rate of $1.25 = $1 U.S. dollar.

                                                                                  DR (£)                         CR (£)

Debtors 60,993

Exchange gain 60,993

To retranslate the seller of 5 million euros at the year end sport rate of $1.27 = $1 U.S. dollar.

                                                                                              DR (£)                         CR (£)

Profit on derivative 31,746

Derivative gain 31,746

To value the derivative at the year-end fair value which is the difference between the forward rate and the agreed forward rate at the balance sheet for the contract maturing after 6 months

According to Parameswaran, (2011), recognising the impact of the exchange rates on the value of the value of the debtor, the derivative cancels each other out. In this case, the difference that is seen between the debtor and the gain on the derivative on the other party is attributed to the spot rate being used for the debtor and the forward rate for the derivative (Ltd, 2017).

Ltd, P. K. F. I. (2017). Wiley IFRS 2017 Interpretation and Application of IFRS Standards. Somerset John Wiley & Sons, Incorporated 2017

Parameswaran, S. K. (2011). Fundamentals of financial instruments: An introduction to stocks, bonds, foreign exchange, and derivatives. Hoboken, N.J: Wiley.

Walmsley, J. (2000). The foreign exchange and money markets guide. New York: Wiley

== See also ==
- Foreign exchange derivative
