= Foreign exchange option =

Derivative financial instrument

In finance, a foreign exchange option (commonly shortened to just FX option or currency option) is a derivative financial instrument that gives the right but not the obligation to exchange money denominated in one currency into another currency at a pre-agreed exchange rate on a specified date. See Foreign exchange derivative.

== Valuation: the Garman–Kohlhagen model ==
As in the Black–Scholes model for stock options and the Black model for certain interest rate options, the value of a European option on an FX rate is typically calculated by assuming that the rate follows a log-normal process.

The earliest currency options pricing model was published by Biger and Hull, (Financial Management, spring 1983). The model preceded the Garman and Kolhagen's Model. In 1983 Garman and Kohlhagen extended the Black–Scholes model to cope with the presence of two interest rates (one for each currency). Suppose that $r_d$ is the risk-free interest rate to expiry of the domestic currency and $r_f$ is the foreign currency risk-free interest rate (where domestic currency is the currency in which we obtain the value of the option; the formula also requires that FX rates – both strike and current spot be quoted in terms of "units of domestic currency per unit of foreign currency"). The results are also in the same units and to be meaningful need to be converted into one of the currencies.

Then the domestic currency value of a call option into the foreign currency is

$$c = S_0e^{-r_f T}\mathcal{N}(d_1) - Ke^{-r_d T}\mathcal{N}(d_2)$$

The value of a put option has value

_{$p = Ke^{-r_d T}\mathcal{N}(-d_2) - S_0e^{-r_f T}\mathcal{N}(-d_1)$}

where :

$$d_1 = \frac{\ln(S_0/K) + (r_d - r_f + \sigma^2/2)T}{\sigma\sqrt{T}}$$
$$d_2 = d_1 - \sigma\sqrt{T}$$

$S_0$ is the current spot rate
$K$ is the strike price
$\mathcal{N}(x)$ is the cumulative normal distribution function
$r_d$ is domestic risk free simple interest rate
$r_f$ is foreign risk free simple interest rate
$T$ is the time to maturity (calculated according to the appropriate day count convention)
and $\sigma$ is the volatility of the FX rate.
