= Closeout =

Closeout or close-out may refer to:

- Close-out (aerospace)
- Closeout (sale)
- Closeout (surfing)
- Closeout, a basketball defensive technique
- Closeout, a kind of match fixing in martial arts
