= Fixed income arbitrage =

Arbitrage exploiting differing interest rates

Fixed-income arbitrage is a group of market-neutral-investment strategies that are designed to take advantage of differences in interest rates between varying fixed-income securities or contracts (Jefferson, 2007). Arbitrage in terms of investment strategy, involves buying securities on one market for immediate resale on another market in order to profit from a price discrepancy.

Fixed-income securities are debt instruments issued by a government, corporation, or other entity to finance and expand their operations. The purchasing of any fixed-income security is known as a loan from the investor to the issuer. These 'loans' made from the investor to the borrower are in exchange for regular income payments to the investor, as well as the investor receiving the capital returned upon maturity of the loan.

The mechanics of the agreement are similar across all variations of fixed-income instruments, whereby there is a fixed tenor and schedule of income payments. Repayment of capital at maturity is expected and will only not occur if the issuer defaults or becomes insolvent. The following are examples of fixed-income securities:

- Treasury bills
- Corporate bonds
- Municipal bonds
- Credit default swaps

The mechanics of the strategy are to purchase a fixed-income security and resell it at a higher price. The strategy is used when there are signs of mispricing of fixed-income securities in the market, whereby, for example, fixed-income arbitrage funds will take a short or long position on the security to benefit when the price is later corrected in the market. Fixed-income securities differ from equities, whereby for fixed-income securities dividends are non-discretionary. The strategy is most commonly used by investment banks and hedge funds globally. See also Fixed-income relative-value investing.

== Fixed-Income Arbitrage Strategies in the Market ==
=== Swap Spread Arbitrage ===
Within the fixed-income markets, an interest-rate swap is a derivative that exchanges the cash flows generated from a fixed-rate loan (a fixed-income security) to the cashflows generated from a floating-rate loan. The group receiving the fixed-rate (E.g. receiving the fixed-rate on a Treasury Bond), better known as the Yield to Maturity Swap Rate (‘YTMsr’), pays the floating Bank Bill Swap Rate (‘BBSW’). For every time period, the arbitrageur's net payment is the YTMsr – BBSW, then this is multiplied by the notional principal amount (E.g. A$10,000) and the time between payments (E.g. 6 months). The group paying the fixed-rate, which is the owner of the Treasury bond financed at the repurchased rate, will also receive a fixed-coupon on the yield to maturity (E.g. yield to maturity of the treasury bond), whilst paying interest on the repurchase agreement, known as repo financing. The swap spread is the yield to maturity on the Treasury bond minus the fixed-rate of the swap.

Swap Spread = Yield to Maturity of Swap – Yield to Maturity of Treasury Bond

The result of this equation is most often positive. Since the swap's floating rate is the BBSW, we find that the swap will be above the yield to maturity of the Treasury Bond as the swap is almost always above the repurchase rate (RBA, 2021). This is because the BBSW is used as a benchmark for the pricing of AUD derivatives and securities, hence the repurchase rate of the Treasury Bond should be higher.

=== Yield Curve Arbitrage ===
Yield Curve Arbitrage involves taking long and short positions at different points along the yield curve. This strategy involves identifying points on the yield curve that show a mismatch in pricing, this mismatch results in either rich or cheap points. This will involve investors re-modelling to see points in which the bond's actual yield differs from the model-implied yield and will bet on the reversion of the curvature. Once this has been identified the investor will seek to profit off either the rich or cheap points on the yield curve by going short or long bonds. They will hold these investments until the trade converges, and then the trade can be liquidated for profit. In taking short and long term positions on the yield curve, the investor is hedging their investments. An example of this would be betting against a government bond, whilst also buying two bonds on either side of the original bet (Karsimus, 2015).

=== Mortgage Arbitrage ===
Mortgage Arbitrage strategy is used by fixed-income traders, whereby they trade what are known as Mortgage-backed securities (MBS's). MBS's are securities that are a grouping of mortgages that are collateralized by real estate and guaranteed by an agency. An agency in this case is where the principal has hired the agent to perform a service on their behalf, in this case of MBS's, a bank could be the agent for the security. Collateralization is when the value of an asset is used to secure a loan, whereby if a default occurs, the issuer of the loan can seize the asset and consequentially sell the asset, in this case of MBS's, it would be the selling of the real estate assets to offset the losses from the loan.

Through the securitization, the group of mortgages held by the group, e.g. a bank, is then grouped into a MBS and then sold off to investors as units or certificates. This process of passing on the group of mortgages to the investor is known as a ‘pass-through security’. The cash flows generated from the mortgages, net of the commissions charged by the originator of the mortgages, pass through the original financial institution through to the now, owner, of the security. Simply speaking, the now, owner of the security receives their share of the overall mortgage payments, by payment of both interest and principal. Mortgage pass-throughs differ from bonds as each cashflow from a mortgage pass-through will include both interest and principal, whereas typical bonds pay only interest, with the principal returned at the end of the tenor. Another key difference is that as the principal is reduced, the payments for each cashflow differ with time, hence the amount of interest received on each cashflow will decrease as the amount of capital declines on the principal. Hence since the security is self-liquidating, once all mortgages in the MBS's are paid, the investment is completed. This strategy is focused on traders receiving income rather than capital gains.

In terms of mortgage arbitrage strategy, the trader invests in long term MBS's and hedges the risk on the interest rate by shorting government bonds or swaps. This is an attempt to profit from the MBS's yield being higher than the government bond yield. The reason that MBS's tend to have a higher yield is because of the general risk that the assets that they are secured by pose. This risk is default risk.

Low interest rates pose a negative impact to MBSs. An environment with lower interest rates allows those with mortgages to make more prepayments, which consequently reduces the maturity of the loan, as well as the principal, resulting in less interest being earned from the asset, higher interest rates also negatively affect MBS, as an increase in interest rates affects the ability for individuals to make payments on their mortgage, which increases the risk of default. Lastly, the strategy can also face liquidity risks. An example of increased liquidity risk occurring would be in a climate whereby a crisis occurred (E.g. the GFC in 2008), whereby market liquidity begins to drop, subsequently making it more difficult for individuals or groups to borrow.

=== Volatility Arbitrage ===
Fixed-income volatility arbitrage is a strategy designed to profit from pricing differences in a fixed income security's forecasted future price-volatility and the implied volatility of options based on the same asset. Similar to the case of finding the real price of a stock, in this strategy the arbitrageur must make a judgement on whether implied volatility of a security is overpriced or under-priced. An example of this would be in the opportunity in which a stock option is considerably under-priced because the implied volatility of the asset was too low, in a move to profit off the mispricing the arbitrageur would subsequently choose to open a long call option combined with a short position in the underlying stock.

=== Capital Structure Arbitrage ===
Capital structure arbitrage is a strategy used globally in finance, designed to profit from current market mispricings in security classes issued from a single company. It is in the mispricing of these securities that arbitrageurs attempt to profit from. Such mispricings occur when an arbitrageur buys undervalued securities and sells overpriced securities, like other arbitrage strategies.

This strategy is specifically designed to profit from the mispricing of a company's debt and its other securities. In employing this strategy, it is common for arbitrageurs to use a structural model to measure the richness and cheapness of credit default swap spreads (CDS spreads). The structure model is designed to calculate the fair value of such CDS spreads based on a company's debt and other securities. If the model indicates that the current market CDS spread is materially different than that of the predicted spread, the arbitrageur must decide whether the market misprices equity value or the CDS market is not producing fair prices. These are different mispricing cases, but in both instances, the arbitrageur will attempt to profit from identifying such mispricings by selling credit protection and delta-hedge it by selling short delta equities and expect convergence to occur. Assuming that CDS bid-ask spreads and equity prices move in the same direction, if either the CDS spread widens or the equity price increases, the equity position can cushion the loss on the CDS position. Similarly, the CDS position can cushion the loss on the equity position. In the case that the CDS spread is materially lower than the predicted spread from the structured model, then one would buy credit protection and hedge such a position through purchasing delta shares.

== Who uses it? Why? ==
Fixed-income arbitrage is a strategy that involves a substantial level of risk. The strategy itself provides relatively small returns that can be offset with huge losses given varying market conditions and poor judgement calls. Due to the risk-return nature of the strategy, it is not often used by common investors. It is more often used by asset rich groups, such as hedge funds and investments banks that have significant capital that can be deployed to capitalise on the smaller-riskier returns.
