= Foreign exchange risk =

Type of financial risk

Foreign exchange risk (also known as FX risk, exchange rate risk or currency risk) is a financial risk that exists when a financial transaction is denominated in a currency other than the domestic currency of the company. The exchange risk arises when there is a risk of an unfavourable change in exchange rate between the domestic currency and the denominated currency before the date when the transaction is completed.

Foreign exchange risk also exists when the foreign subsidiary of a firm maintains financial statements in a currency other than the domestic currency of the consolidated entity.

Investors and businesses exporting or importing goods and services, or making foreign investments, have an exchange-rate risk but can take steps to manage (i.e. reduce) the risk.

== History ==
Many businesses were unconcerned with, and did not manage, foreign exchange risk under the international Bretton Woods system. It was not until the switch to floating exchange rates, following the collapse of the Bretton Woods system, that firms became exposed to an increased risk from exchange rate fluctuations and began trading an increasing volume of financial derivatives in an effort to hedge their exposure. The currency crises of the 1990s and early 2000s, such as the Mexican peso crisis, Asian currency crisis, 1998 Russian financial crisis, and the Argentine peso crisis, led to substantial losses from foreign exchange and led firms to pay closer attention to their foreign exchange risk.

== Types of foreign exchange risk ==
=== Economic risk ===
A firm has economic risk (also known as forecast risk) to the degree that its market value is influenced by unexpected exchange-rate fluctuations, which can severely affect the firm's market share with regard to its competitors, the firm's future cash flows, and ultimately the firm's value. Economic risk can affect the present value of future cash flows. An example of an economic risk would be a shift in exchange rates that influences the demand for a good sold in a foreign country.

Another example of an economic risk is the possibility that macroeconomic conditions will influence an investment in a foreign country. Macroeconomic conditions include exchange rates, government regulations, and political stability. When financing an investment or a project, a company's operating costs, debt obligations, and the ability to predict economically unsustainable circumstances should be thoroughly calculated in order to produce adequate revenues in covering those economic risks. For instance, when an American company invests money in a manufacturing plant in Spain, the Spanish government might institute changes that negatively impact the American company's ability to operate the plant, such as changing laws or even seizing the plant, or to otherwise make it difficult for the American company to move its profits out of Spain. As a result, all possible risks that outweigh an investment's profits and outcomes need to be closely scrutinized and strategically planned before initiating the investment. Other examples of potential economic risk are steep market downturns, unexpected cost overruns, and low demand for goods.

International investments are associated with significantly higher economic risk levels as compared to domestic investments. In international firms, economic risk heavily affects not only investors but also bondholders and shareholders, especially when dealing with the sale and purchase of foreign government bonds. However, economic risk can also create opportunities and profits for investors globally. When investing in foreign bonds, investors can profit from the fluctuation of the foreign-exchange markets and interest rates in different countries. Investors should always be aware of possible changes by the foreign regulatory authorities. Changing laws and regulations regarding sizes, types, timing, credit quality, and disclosures of bonds will immediately and directly affect investments in foreign countries. For example, if a central bank in a foreign country raises interest rates or the legislature increases taxes, the return on investment will be significantly impacted. As a result, economic risk can be reduced by utilizing various analytical and predictive tools that consider the diversification of time, exchange rates, and economic development in multiple countries, which offer different currencies, instruments, and industries.

When making a comprehensive economic forecast, several risk factors should be noted. One of the most effective strategies is to develop a set of positive and negative risks that associate with the standard economic metrics of an investment. In a macroeconomic model, major risks include changes in GDP, exchange-rate fluctuations, and commodity-price and stock-market fluctuations. It is equally critical to identify the stability of the economic system. Before initiating an investment, a firm should consider the stability of the investing sector that influences the exchange-rate changes. For instance, a service sector is less likely to have inventory swings and exchange-rate changes as compared to a large consumer sector.

=== Contingent risk ===
A firm has contingent risk when bidding for foreign projects, negotiating other contracts, or handling direct foreign investments. Such a risk arises from the potential of a firm to suddenly face a transnational or economic foreign-exchange risk contingent on the outcome of some contract or negotiation. For example, a firm could be waiting for a project bid to be accepted by a foreign business or government that, if accepted, would result in an immediate receivable. While waiting, the firm faces a contingent risk from the uncertainty as to whether or not that receivable will accrue.

=== Transaction risk ===
Companies will often participate in a transaction involving more than one currency. In order to meet the legal and accounting standards of processing these transactions, companies have to translate foreign currencies involved into their domestic currency. A firm has transaction risk whenever it has contractual cash flows (receivables and payables) whose values are subject to unanticipated changes in exchange rates due to a contract being denominated in a foreign currency. To realize the domestic value of its foreign-denominated cash flows, the firm must exchange, or translate, the foreign currency for domestic.

When firms negotiate contracts with set prices and delivery dates in the face of a volatile foreign exchange market, with rates constantly fluctuating between initiating a transaction and its settlement, or payment, those firms face the risk of significant loss. Businesses have the goal of making all monetary transactions profitable ones, and the currency markets must thus be carefully observed.

Applying public accounting rules causes firms with transnational risks to be impacted by a process known as "re-measurement". The current value of contractual cash flows are remeasured on each balance sheet.

=== Translation risk ===
A firm's translation risk is the extent to which its financial reporting is affected by exchange-rate movements. As all firms generally must prepare consolidated financial statements for reporting purposes, the consolidation process for multinationals entails translating foreign assets and liabilities, or the financial statements of foreign subsidiaries, from foreign to domestic currency. While translation risk may not affect a firm's cash flows, it could have a significant impact on a firm's reported earnings and therefore its stock price.

Translation risk deals with the risk to a company's equities, assets, liabilities, or income, any of which can change in value due to fluctuating foreign exchange rates when a portion is denominated in a foreign currency. A company doing business in a foreign country will eventually have to exchange its host country's currency back into their domestic currency. When exchange rates appreciate or depreciate, significant, difficult-to-predict changes in the value of the foreign currency can occur. For example, U.S. companies must translate Euro, Pound, Yen, etc., statements into U.S. dollars. A foreign subsidiary's income statement and balance sheet are the two financial statements that must be translated. A subsidiary doing business in the host country usually follows that country's prescribed translation method, which may vary, depending on the subsidiary's business operations.

Subsidiaries can be characterized as either an integrated or a self-sustaining foreign entity. An integrated foreign entity operates as an extension of the parent company, with cash flows and business operations that are highly interrelated with those of the parent. A self-sustaining foreign entity operates in its local economic environment, independent of the parent company. Both integrated and self-sustaining foreign entities operate use functional currency, which is the currency of the primary economic environment in which the subsidiary operates and in which day-to-day operations are transacted. Management must evaluate the nature of its foreign subsidiaries to determine the appropriate functional currency for each.

There are three translation methods: current-rate method, temporal method, and U.S. translation procedures. Under the current-rate method, all financial statement line items are translated at the "current" exchange rate. Under the temporal method, specific assets and liabilities are translated at exchange rates consistent with the timing of the item's creation. The U.S. translation procedures differentiate foreign subsidiaries by functional currency, not subsidiary characterization. If a firm translates by the temporal method, a zero net exposed position is called fiscal balance. The temporal method cannot be achieved by the current-rate method because total assets will have to be matched by an equal amount of debt, but the equity section of the balance sheet must be translated at historical exchange rates.

== Measuring risk ==
If foreign-exchange markets are efficient—such that purchasing power parity, interest rate parity, and the international Fisher effect hold true—a firm or investor need not concern itself with foreign exchange risk. A deviation from one or more of the three international parity conditions generally needs to occur for there to be a significant exposure to foreign-exchange risk.

Financial risk is most commonly measured in terms of the variance or standard deviation of a quantity such as percentage returns or rates of change. In foreign exchange, a relevant factor would be the rate of change of the foreign currency spot exchange rate. A variance, or spread, in exchange rates indicates enhanced risk, whereas standard deviation represents exchange-rate risk by the amount exchange rates deviate, on average, from the mean exchange rate in a probabilistic distribution. A higher standard deviation would signal a greater currency risk. Because of its uniform treatment of deviations and for the automatically squaring of deviation values, economists have criticized the accuracy of standard deviation as a risk indicator. Alternatives such as average absolute deviation and semivariance have been advanced for measuring financial risk.

=== Value at risk ===
Practitioners have advanced, and regulators have accepted, a financial risk management technique called value at risk (VaR), which examines the tail end of a distribution of returns for changes in exchange rates, to highlight the outcomes with the worst returns. Banks in Europe have been authorized by the Bank for International Settlements to employ VaR models of their own design in establishing capital requirements for given levels of market risk. Using the VaR model helps risk managers determine the amount that could be lost on an investment portfolio over a certain period of time with a given probability of changes in exchange rates.

== Managing risk ==
=== Transaction hedging ===
Firms with exposure to foreign-exchange risk may use a number of hedging strategies to reduce that risk. Transaction exposure can be reduced either with the use of money markets, foreign exchange derivatives—such as forward contracts, options, futures contracts, and swaps—or with operational techniques such as currency invoicing, leading and lagging of receipts and payments, and exposure netting. Each hedging strategy comes with its own benefits that may make it more suitable than another, based on the nature of the business and risks it may encounter.

Forward and futures contracts serve similar purposes: they both allow transactions that take place in the future—for a specified price at a specified rate—that offset otherwise adverse exchange fluctuations. Forward contracts are more flexible, to an extent, because they can be customized to specific transactions, whereas futures come in standard amounts and are based on certain commodities or assets, such as other currencies. Because futures are only available for certain currencies and time periods, they cannot entirely mitigate risk, because there is always the chance that exchange rates will move in your favor. However, the standardization of futures can be a part of what makes them attractive to some: they are well-regulated and are traded only on exchanges.

Two popular and inexpensive methods companies can use to minimize potential losses is hedging with options and forward contracts. If a company decides to purchase an option, it is able to set a rate that is "at-worst" for the transaction. If the option expires and it's out-of-the-money, the company is able to execute the transaction in the open market at a favorable rate. If a company decides to take out a forward contract, it will set a specific currency rate for a set date in the future.

Currency invoicing refers to the practice of invoicing transactions in the currency that benefits the firm. This does not necessarily eliminate foreign exchange risk, but rather moves its burden from one party to another. A firm can invoice its imports from another country in its home currency, which would move the risk to the exporter and away from itself. This technique may not be as simple as it sounds; if the exporter's currency is more volatile than that of the importer, the firm would want to avoid invoicing in that currency. If both the importer and exporter want to avoid using their own currencies, it is also fairly common to conduct the exchange using a third, more stable currency.

If a firm looks to leading and lagging as a hedge, it must exercise extreme caution. Leading and lagging refer to the movement of cash inflows or outflows either forward or backward in time. For example, if a firm must pay a large sum in three months but is also set to receive a similar amount from another order, it might move the date of receipt of the sum to coincide with the payment. This delay would be termed lagging. If the receipt date were moved sooner, this would be termed leading the payment.

Another method to reduce exposure transaction risk is natural hedging (or netting foreign-exchange exposures), which is an efficient form of hedging because it will reduce the margin that is taken by banks when businesses exchange currencies; and it is a form of hedging that is easy to understand. To enforce the netting, there will be a systematic-approach requirement, as well as a real-time look at exposure and a platform for initiating the process, which, along with the foreign cash flow uncertainty, can make the procedure seem more difficult. Having a back-up plan, such as foreign-currency accounts, will be helpful in this process. The companies that deal with inflows and outflows in the same currency will experience efficiencies and a reduction in risk by calculating the net of the inflows and outflows, and using foreign-currency account balances that will pay in part for some or all of the exposure.

=== Translation hedging ===
Translation exposure is largely dependent on the translation methods required by accounting standards of the home country. For example, the United States Federal Accounting Standards Board specifies when and where to use certain methods. Firms can manage translation exposure by performing a balance sheet hedge, since translation exposure arises from discrepancies between net assets and net liabilities solely from exchange rate differences. Following this logic, a firm could acquire an appropriate amount of exposed assets or liabilities to balance any outstanding discrepancy. Foreign exchange derivatives may also be used to hedge against translation exposure.

A common technique to hedge translation risk is called balance-sheet hedging, which involves speculating on the forward market in hopes that a cash profit will be realized to offset a non-cash loss from translation. This requires an equal amount of exposed foreign currency assets and liabilities on the firm's consolidated balance sheet. If this is achieved for each foreign currency, the net translation exposure will be zero. A change in the exchange rates will change the value of exposed liabilities to an equal degree but opposite to the change in the value of exposed assets.

Companies can also attempt to hedge translation risk by purchasing currency swaps or futures contracts. Companies can also request clients to pay in the company's domestic currency, whereby the risk is transferred to the client.

=== Strategies other than financial hedging ===
Firms may adopt strategies other than financial hedging for managing their economic or operating exposure, by carefully selecting production sites with a mind for lowering costs, using a policy of flexible sourcing in its supply chain management, diversifying its export market across a greater number of countries, or by implementing strong research and development activities and differentiating its products in pursuit of less foreign-exchange risk exposure.

By putting more effort into researching alternative methods for production and development, it is possible that a firm may discover more ways to produce their outputs locally rather than relying on export sources that would expose them to the foreign exchange risk. By paying attention to currency fluctuations around the world, firms can advantageously relocate their production to other countries. For this strategy to be effective, the new site must have lower production costs. There are many factors a firm must consider before relocating, such as a foreign nation's political and economic stability.

== See also ==
- Privatized foreign currency risk
