= Exchange rate =

Rate at which one currency will be exchanged for another

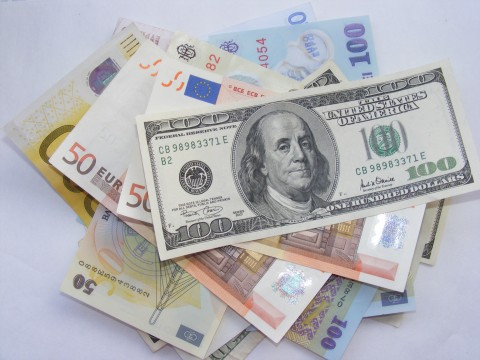
A selection of banknotes from three currencies: United States dollar, Euro, and Romanian leu.

In finance, an exchange rate is the rate at which one currency will be exchanged for another currency. Currencies are most commonly national currencies, but may be sub-national as in the case of Hong Kong or supra-national as in the case of the euro.

The exchange rate is also regarded as the value of one country's currency in relation to another currency. For example, an interbank exchange rate of 141 Japanese yen to the United States dollar means that ¥141 will be exchanged for US$1 or that US$1 will be exchanged for ¥141. In this case it is said that the price of a dollar in relation to yen is ¥141, or equivalently that the price of a yen in relation to dollars is $1/141.

The exchange rate may be quoted as a ratio, for instance, USD/EUR might be equal to 0.8625.

Each country determines the exchange rate regime that will apply to its currency. For example, a currency may be floating, pegged (fixed), or a hybrid. Governments can impose certain limits and controls on exchange rates. Countries can also have a strong or weak currency. There is no agreement in the economic literature on the optimal national exchange rate policy (unlike on the subject of trade where free trade is considered optimal). Rather, national exchange rate regimes reflect political considerations.

In floating exchange rate regimes, exchange rates are determined in the foreign exchange market, which is open to a wide range of different types of buyers and sellers, and where currency trading is continuous: 24 hours a day except weekends (i.e. trading from 20:15 GMT on Sunday until 22:00 GMT Friday). The spot exchange rate is the current exchange rate, while the forward exchange rate is an exchange rate that is quoted and traded today but for delivery and payment on a specific future date.

In the retail currency exchange market, money dealers offer different prices for buying and selling currencies. Most trades are to or from the local currency. The buying rate is the rate at which money dealers will buy foreign currency, and the selling rate is the rate at which they will sell that currency. The quoted rates will incorporate an allowance for a dealer's margin (or profit) in trading, or else the margin may be recovered in the form of a commission or in some other way. Different rates may also be quoted for cash, a documentary transaction or for electronic transfers. The higher rate on documentary transactions has been justified as compensating for the additional time and cost of clearing the document. On the other hand, cash is available for resale immediately, but incurs security, storage, and transportation costs, and the cost of tying up capital in a stock of banknotes (bills).

== The retail exchange market ==
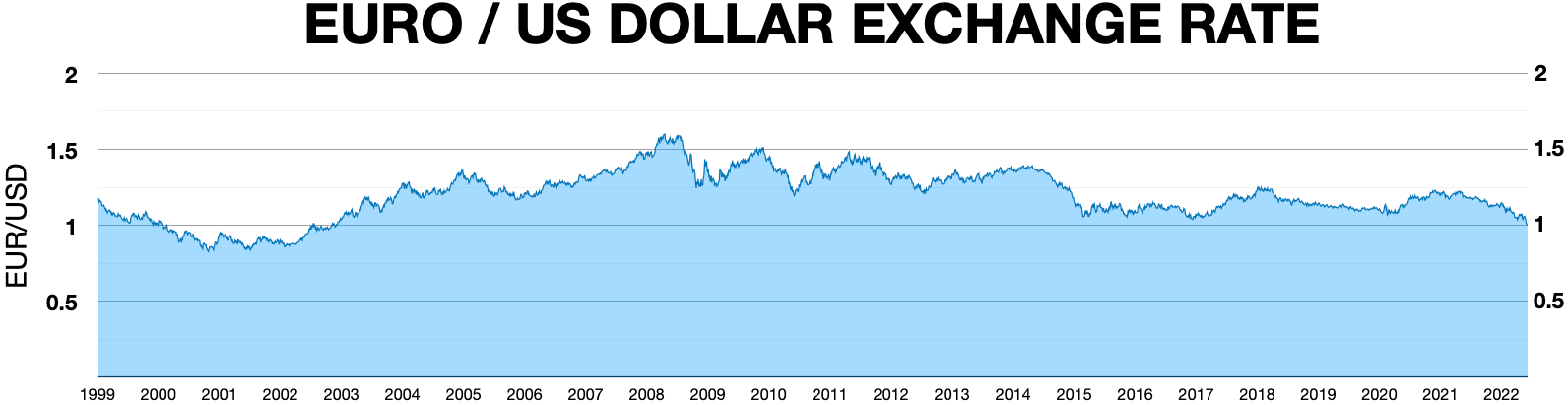
EUR/USD exchange rate

Currency for international travel and cross-border payments is predominantly purchased from banks, foreign exchange brokerages and various forms of bureaux de change. These retail outlets source currency from the interbank markets, which are valued by the Bank for International Settlements at US$5.3 trillion per day. The purchase is made at the spot contract rate. Retail customers will be charged, in the form of commission or otherwise, to cover the provider's costs and generate a profit. One form of charge is the use of an exchange rate that is less favourable than the wholesale spot rate. The difference between retail buying and selling prices is referred to as the bid–ask spread.

== Retail foreign exchange trading ==
Retail foreign exchange trading is a small segment of the larger foreign exchange market where individuals speculate on the exchange rate between different currencies. This segment has developed with the advent of dedicated electronic trading platforms and the internet, which allows individuals to access the global currency markets. As of 2016, it was reported that retail foreign exchange trading represented 5.5% of the whole foreign exchange market ($282 billion in daily trading turnover).

== Quotations ==
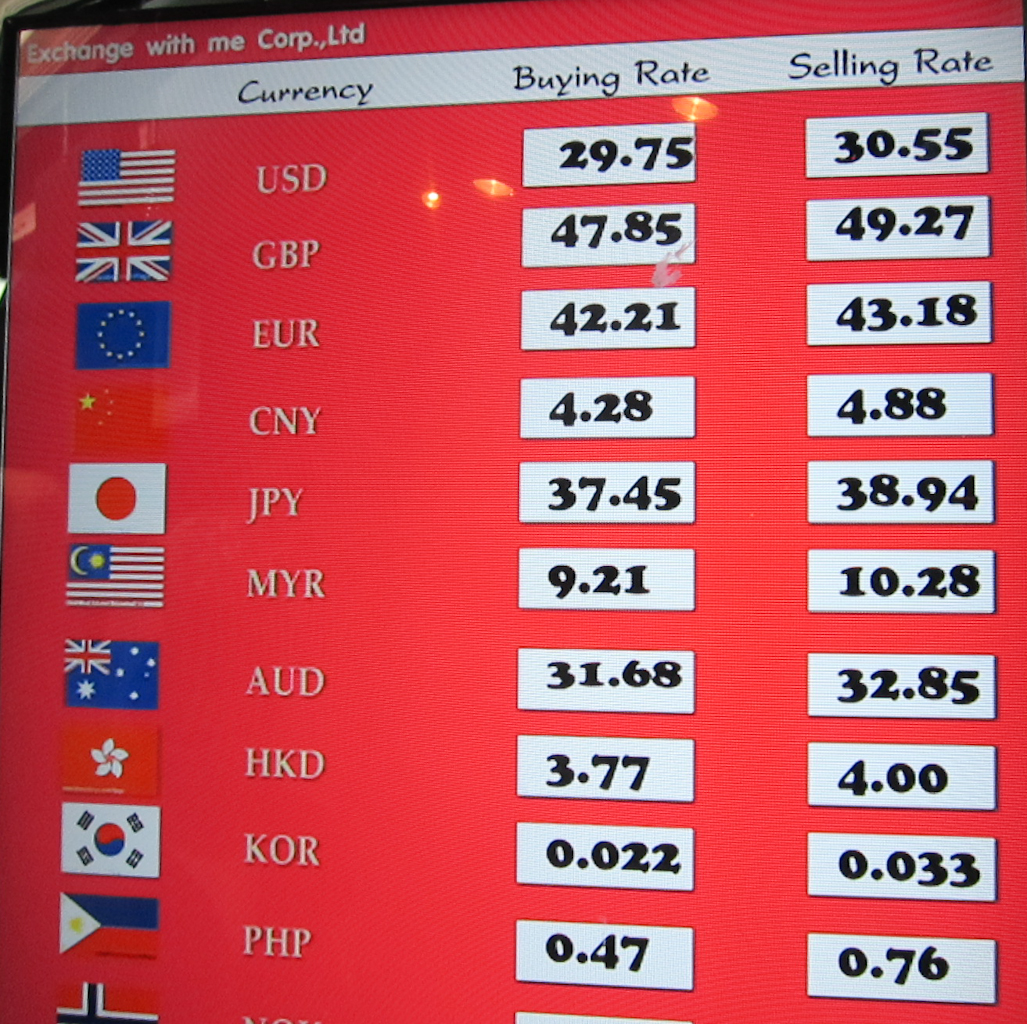
Exchange rates display in Thailand

There is a market convention that rules the notation used to communicate the fixed and variable currencies in a quotation. For example, in a conversion from EUR to AUD, EUR is the fixed currency, AUD is the variable currency, and the exchange rate indicates how many Australian dollars would be paid or received for 1 euro.

In some areas of Europe and in the retail market in the United Kingdom, EUR and GBP are reversed so that GBP is quoted as the fixed currency to the euro. In order to determine which is the fixed currency when neither currency is on the above list (i.e. both are "other"), market convention is to use the fixed currency which gives an exchange rate greater than 1.000. This reduces rounding issues and the need to use excessive numbers of decimal places. There are some exceptions to this rule: for example, the Japanese often quote their currency as the base to other currencies.

Quotation using a country's home currency as the unit currency (i.e., with a value of 1), as in US$1.11 = €1.00 (in the Eurozone), is known as indirect quotation or quantity quotation and is used in British newspapers; it is also common in Australia, New Zealand and the Eurozone.

Quotation using a country's home currency as the price currency is known as direct quotation or price quotation (from that country's perspective). For example, €0.8989 = US$1.00 (in the Eurozone). and is used in most countries. Using direct quotation, if the home currency is strengthening (that is, appreciating, or becoming more valuable) then the exchange rate number decreases. Conversely, if the foreign currency is strengthening and the home currency is depreciating, the exchange rate number increases.

Market convention from the early 1980s to 2006 was that most currency pairs were quoted to four decimal places for spot transactions and up to six decimal places for forward outrights or swaps. (The fourth decimal place is usually referred to as a "pip"). An exception to this was exchange rates with a value of less than 1.000 which were usually quoted to five or six decimal places. Although there is no fixed rule, exchange rates numerically greater than around 20 were usually quoted to three decimal places and exchange rates greater than 80 were quoted to two decimal places. Currencies over 5000 were usually quoted with no decimal places (for example, the former Turkish Lira). e.g. (GBPOMR : 0.765432 - : 1.4436 - EURJPY : 165.29). In other words, quotes are given with five digits. Where rates are below 1, quotes frequently include five decimal places.

In 2005, Barclays Capital broke with convention by quoting spot exchange rates with five or six decimal places on their electronic dealing platform. The contraction of spreads (the difference between the bid and ask rates) arguably necessitated finer pricing and gave the banks the ability to try to win transactions on multibank trading platforms where all banks may otherwise have been quoting the same price. A number of other banks have since followed this system.

== Exchange rate regime ==
Countries are free to choose which type of exchange rate regime they will apply to their currency. The main types of exchange rate regimes are: free-floating, pegged (fixed), or a hybrid.

In free-floating regimes, exchange rates are allowed to vary against each other according to the market forces of supply and demand. Exchange rates for such currencies are likely to change almost constantly as quoted on financial markets, mainly by banks, around the world.

A movable or adjustable peg system is a system of fixed exchange rates, but with a provision for the revaluation (usually devaluation) of a currency. For example, between 1994 and 2005, the Chinese yuan renminbi (RMB) was pegged to the United States dollar at RMB 8.2768 to $1. China was not the only country to do this; from the end of World War II until 1967, Western European countries all maintained fixed exchange rates with the US dollar based on the Bretton Woods system. But that system had to be abandoned in favor of floating, market-based regimes due to market pressures and speculation, according to President Richard M. Nixon in a speech on August 15, 1971, in what is known as the Nixon Shock.

Still, some governments strive to keep their currency within a narrow range. As a result, currencies become over-valued or under-valued, leading to excessive trade deficits or surpluses.

== Exchange rate classification ==
From the perspective of bank foreign exchange trading

- Buying rate: Also known as the purchase price, it is the price used by the foreign exchange bank to buy foreign currency from the customer. In general, the exchange rate where the foreign currency is converted to a smaller number of domestic currencies is the buying rate, which indicates how much the country's currency is required to buy a certain amount of foreign exchange.
- Selling rate: Also known as the foreign exchange selling price, it refers to the exchange rate used by the bank to sell foreign exchange to customers. It indicates how much the country's currency needs to be recovered if the bank sells a certain amount of foreign exchange.
- Middle rate: The average of the bid price and the ask price. Commonly used in newspapers, magazines or economic analysis.

According to the length of delivery after foreign exchange transactions

- Spot exchange rate: Refers to the exchange rate of spot foreign exchange transactions. That is, after the foreign exchange transaction is completed, the exchange rate in Delivery within two working days. The exchange rate that is generally listed on the foreign exchange market is generally referred to as the spot exchange rate unless it specifically indicates the forward exchange rate.
- Forward exchange rate: To be delivered in a certain period of time in the future, but beforehand, the buyer and the seller will enter into a contract to reach an agreement. When the delivery date is reached, both parties to the agreement will deliver the transaction at the exchange rate and amount of the reservation. Forward foreign exchange trading is an appointment-based transaction, which is due to the different time the foreign exchange purchaser needs for foreign exchange funds and the introduction of foreign exchange risk. The forward exchange rate is based on the spot exchange rate, which is represented by the "premium", "discount", and "parity" of the spot exchange rate.

According to the method of setting the exchange rate

- Basic rate: Usually choose a key convertible currency that is the most commonly used in international economic transactions and accounts for the largest proportion of foreign exchange reserves. Compare it with the currency of the country and set the exchange rate. This exchange rate is the basic exchange rate. The key currency generally refers to a world currency, which is widely used for pricing, settlement, reserve currency, freely convertible, and internationally accepted currency.
- Cross rate: After the basic exchange rate is worked out, the exchange rate of the local currency against other foreign currencies can be calculated through the basic exchange rate. The resulting exchange rate is the cross exchange rate.

=== Other classifications ===
According to the payment method in foreign exchange transactions

- Telegraphic exchange rate
- Mail transfer rate
- Demand draft rate

According to the level of foreign exchange controls

- Official rate: The official exchange rate is the rate of exchange announced by a country's foreign exchange administration. Usually used by countries with strict foreign exchange controls.
- Market rate: The market exchange rate refers to the real exchange rate for trading foreign exchange in the free market. It fluctuates with changes in foreign exchange supply and demand conditions.

According to the international exchange rate regime

- Fixed exchange rate: It means that the exchange rate between a country's currency and another country's currency is basically fixed, and the fluctuation of exchange rate is very small.
- Floating exchange rate: It means that the monetary authorities of a country do not stipulate the official exchange rate of the country's currency against other currencies, nor does it have any upper or lower limit of exchange rate fluctuations. The local currency is determined by the supply and demand relationship of the foreign exchange market, and it is free to rise and fall.

Whether inflation is included

- Nominal exchange rate: an exchange rate that is officially announced or marketed which does not consider inflation.
- Real exchange rate: The nominal exchange rate eliminating inflation

== Factors affecting the change of exchange rate ==
1. Balance of payments: When a country has a large international balance of payments deficit or trade deficit, it means that its foreign exchange earnings are less than foreign exchange expenditures and its demand for foreign exchange exceeds its supply, so its foreign exchange rate rises, and its currency depreciates.
2. Interest rate level: Interest rates are the cost and profit of borrowing capital. When a country raises its interest rate or its domestic interest rate is higher than the foreign interest rate, it will cause capital inflow, thereby increasing the demand for domestic currency, allowing the currency to appreciate and the foreign exchange depreciate.
3. Inflation factor: The inflation rate of a country rises, the purchasing power of money declines, the paper currency depreciates internally, and then the foreign currency appreciates. If both countries have inflation, the currencies of countries with high inflation will depreciate against those with low inflation. The latter is a relative revaluation of the former.
4. Fiscal and monetary policy: Although the influence of monetary policy on the exchange rate changes of a country's government is indirect, it is also very important. In general, the huge fiscal revenue and expenditure deficit caused by expansionary fiscal and monetary policies and inflation will devalue the domestic currency. The tightening fiscal and monetary policies will reduce fiscal expenditures, stabilize the currency, and increase the value of the domestic currency.
5. Speculation: If speculators expect a certain currency to appreciate, they will buy a large amount of that currency, which will cause the exchange rate of that currency to rise. Conversely, if speculators expect a certain currency to depreciate, they will sell off a large amount of the currency causing the exchange rate to fall. Speculation is an important factor in the short-term fluctuations in the exchange rate of the foreign exchange market.
6. Government market intervention: When exchange rate fluctuations in the foreign exchange market adversely affect a country's economy, trade, or the government needs to achieve certain policy goals through exchange rate adjustments, monetary authorities can participate in currency trading, buying or selling local or foreign currencies in large quantities in the market. The foreign exchange supply and demand has caused the exchange rate to change.
7. Economic strength of a country: In general, high economic growth rates are not conducive to the local currency's performance in the foreign exchange market in the short term, but in the long run, they strongly support the strong momentum of the local currency.

=== Emerging markets ===
Research on target zones has mainly concentrated on the benefit of stability of exchange rates for industrial countries, but some studies have argued that volatile bilateral exchange rates between industrial countries are in part responsible for financial crisis in emerging markets. According to this view the ability of emerging market economies to compete is weakened because many of the currencies are tied to the US dollar in various fashions either implicitly or explicitly, so fluctuations such as the appreciation of the US dollar to the yen or deutsche Mark have contributed to destabilizing shocks. Most of these countries are net debtors whose debt is denominated in one of the G3 currencies.

In September 2019 Argentina restricted the ability to buy US dollars. Mauricio Macri in 2015 campaigned on a promise to lift restrictions put in place by the left-wing government including the capital controls which have been used in Argentina to manage economic instability. When inflation rose above 20 percent transactions denominated in dollars became commonplace as Argentines moved away from using the peso. In 2011 the government of Cristina Fernández de Kirchner restricted the purchase of dollars leading to a rise in black market dollar purchases. The controls were rolled back after Macri took office and Argentina issued dollar denominated bonds, but when various factors led to a loss in the value of the peso relative to the dollar leading to the restoration of capital controls to prevent additional depreciation amidst peso selloffs.

== Fluctuations in exchange rates ==
A market-based exchange rate will change whenever the values of either of the two component currencies change. A currency becomes more valuable whenever demand for it is greater than the available supply. It will become less valuable whenever demand is less than available supply (this does not mean people no longer want money, it just means they prefer holding their wealth in some other form, possibly another currency).

Increased demand for a currency can be due to either an increased transaction demand for money or an increased speculative demand for money. The transaction demand is highly correlated to a country's level of business activity, gross domestic product (GDP), and employment levels. The more people that are unemployed, the less the public as a whole will spend on goods and services. Central banks typically have little difficulty adjusting the available money supply to accommodate changes in the demand for money due to business transactions.

Speculative demand is much harder for central banks to accommodate, which they influence by adjusting interest rates. A speculator may buy a currency if the return (that is the interest rate) is high enough. In general, the higher a country's interest rates, the greater will be the demand for that currency. It has been argued that such speculation can undermine real economic growth, in particular since large currency speculators may deliberately create downward pressure on a currency by shorting in order to force that central bank to buy their own currency to keep it stable. (When that happens, the speculator can buy the currency back after it depreciates, close out their position, and thereby make a profit.)

For carrier companies shipping goods from one nation to another, exchange rates can often impact them severely. Therefore, most carriers have a CAF charge to account for these fluctuations.

== Purchasing power of currency ==
The real exchange rate (RER) is the purchasing power of a currency relative to another at current exchange rates and prices. It is the ratio of the number of units of a given country's currency necessary to buy a market basket of goods in the other country, after acquiring the other country's currency in the foreign exchange market, to the number of units of the given country's currency that would be necessary to buy that market basket directly in the given country. There are various ways to measure RER.

Thus the real exchange rate is the exchange rate times the relative prices of a market basket of goods in the two countries. For example, the purchasing power of the US dollar relative to that of the euro is the dollar price of a euro (dollars per euro) times the euro price of one unit of the market basket (euros/goods unit) divided by the dollar price of the market basket (dollars per goods unit), and hence is dimensionless. This is the exchange rate (expressed as dollars per euro) times the relative price of the two currencies in terms of their ability to purchase units of the market basket (euros per goods unit divided by dollars per goods unit). If all goods were freely tradable, and foreign and domestic residents purchased identical baskets of goods, purchasing power parity (PPP) would hold for the exchange rate and GDP deflators (price levels) of the two countries, and the real exchange rate would always equal 1.

The rate of change of the real exchange rate over time for the euro versus the dollar equals the rate of appreciation of the euro (the positive or negative percentage rate of change of the dollars-per-euro exchange rate) plus the inflation rate of the euro minus the inflation rate of the dollar.

== Real exchange rate equilibrium and misalignment ==
The Real Exchange Rate (RER) represents the nominal exchange rate adjusted by the relative price of domestic and foreign goods and services, thus reflecting the competitiveness of a country with respect to the rest of the world. More in detail, an appreciation of the currency or a high level of domestic inflation reduces the RER, thus reducing the country's competitiveness and lowering the Current Account (CA). On the other hand, a currency depreciation generates an opposite effect, improving the country's CA.

There is evidence that the RER generally reaches a steady level in the long-term, and that this process is faster in small open economies characterized by fixed exchange rates. Any substantial and persistent RER deviation from its long-run equilibrium level, the so-called RER misalignment, has shown to produce negative impacts on a country's balance of payments. An overvalued RER means that the current RER is above its equilibrium value, whereas an undervalued RER indicates the contrary. Specifically, a prolonged RER overvaluation is widely considered as an early sign of an upcoming crisis, due to the fact that the country becomes vulnerable to both speculative attacks and currency crisis, as happened in Thailand during the 1997 Asian financial crisis. On the other side, a protracted RER undervaluation usually generates pressure on domestic prices, changing the consumers' consumption incentives and, so, misallocating resources between tradable and non-tradable sectors.

Given that RER misalignment and, in particular overvaluation, can undermine the country's export-oriented development strategy, the equilibrium RER measurement is crucial for policymakers. Unfortunately, this variable cannot be observed. The most common method in order to estimate the equilibrium RER is the universally accepted Purchasing Power Parity (PPP) theory, according to which the RER equilibrium level is assumed to remain constant over time. Nevertheless, the equilibrium RER is not a fixed value as it follows the trend of key economic fundamentals, such as different monetary and fiscal policies or asymmetrical shocks between the home country and abroad. Consequently, the PPP doctrine has been largely debated during the years, given that it may signal a natural RER movement towards its new equilibrium as a RER misalignment.

Starting from the 1980s, in order to overcome the limitations of this approach, many researchers tried to find some alternative equilibrium RER measures. Two of the most popular approaches in the economic literature are the Fundamental Equilibrium Exchange Rate (FEER), developed by Williamson (1994), and the Behavioural Equilibrium Exchange Rate (BEER), initially estimated by Clark and MacDonald (1998). The FEER focuses on long-run determinants of the RER, rather than on short-term cyclical and speculative forces. It represents a RER consistent with macroeconomic balance, characterized by the achievement of internal and external balances at the same time. Internal balance is reached when the level of output is in line with both full employment of all available factors of production, and a low and stable rate of inflation. On the other hand, external balance holds when actual and future CA balances are compatible with long-term sustainable net capital flows. Nevertheless, the FEER is viewed as a normative measure of the RER since it is based on some "ideal" economic conditions related to internal and external balances. Particularly, since the sustainable CA position is defined as an exogenous value, this approach has been broadly questioned over time. By contrast, the BEER entails an econometric analysis of the RER behaviour, considering significant RER deviations from its PPP equilibrium level as a consequence of changes in key economic fundamentals. According to this method, the BEER is the RER that results when all the economic fundamentals are at their equilibrium values. Therefore, the total RER misalignment is given by the extent to which economic fundamentals differ from their long-run sustainable levels. In short, the BEER is a more general approach than the FEER, since it is not limited to the long-term perspective, being able to explain RER cyclical movements.

== Bilateral vs. effective exchange rate ==
Example of GNP-weighted nominal exchange rate history of a basket of 6 important currencies (US Dollar, Euro, Japanese Yen, Chinese Renminbi, Swiss Franks, Pound Sterling

Bilateral exchange rate involves a currency pair, while an effective exchange rate is a weighted average of a basket of foreign currencies, and it can be viewed as an overall measure of the country's external competitiveness. A nominal effective exchange rate (NEER) is weighted with the inverse of the asymptotic trade weights. A real effective exchange rate (REER) adjusts NEER by appropriate foreign price level and deflates by the home country price level. Compared to NEER, a GDP weighted effective exchange rate might be more appropriate considering the global investment phenomenon.

== Parallel exchange rate ==
In many countries there is a distinction between the official exchange rate for permitted transactions within the country, and a parallel exchange rate (or black market, grey, unregulated, unofficial, etc. exchange rate) that responds to excess demand for foreign currency at the official exchange rate. The degree by which the parallel exchange rate exceeds the official exchange rate is known as the parallel premium. Unofficial transactions of this nature may be illegal.

== Economic models ==
=== Uncovered interest rate parity model ===
Uncovered interest rate parity (UIRP) states that an appreciation or depreciation of one currency against another currency might be neutralized by a change in the interest rate differential. If US interest rates increase while Japanese interest rates remain unchanged then the US dollar should depreciate against the Japanese yen by an amount that prevents arbitrage (in reality the opposite, appreciation, quite frequently happens in the short-term, as explained below). The future exchange rate is reflected into the forward exchange rate stated today. In our example, the forward exchange rate of the dollar is said to be at a discount because it buys fewer Japanese yen in the forward rate than it does in the spot rate. The yen is said to be at a premium.

UIRP showed no proof of working after the 1990s. Contrary to the theory, currencies with high interest rates characteristically appreciated rather than depreciated on the reward of the containment of inflation and a higher-yielding currency.

=== Balance of payments model ===
The balance of payments model holds that foreign exchange rates are at an equilibrium level if they produce a stable Current account (balance of payments)current account balance. A nation with a trade deficit will experience a reduction in its foreign exchange reserves, which ultimately lowers (depreciates) the value of its currency. A cheaper (undervalued) currency renders the nation's goods (exports) more affordable in the global market while making imports more expensive. After an intermediate period, imports will be forced down and exports to rise, thus stabilizing the trade balance and bring the currency towards equilibrium.

Like purchasing power parity, the balance of payments model focuses largely on tradeable goods and services, ignoring the increasing role of global capital flows. In other words, money is not only chasing goods and services, but to a larger extent, financial assets such as stocks and bonds. Their flows go into the capital account item of the balance of payments, thus balancing the deficit in the current account. The increase in capital flows has given rise to the asset market model effectively.

=== Asset market model ===
The increasing volume of trading of financial assets (stocks and bonds) has required a rethink of its impact on exchange rates. Economic variables such as economic growth, inflation and productivity are no longer the only drivers of currency movements. The proportion of foreign exchange transactions stemming from cross border-trading of financial assets has dwarfed the extent of currency transactions generated from trading in goods and services.

The asset market approach views currencies as asset prices traded in an efficient financial market. Consequently, currencies are increasingly demonstrating a strong correlation with other markets, particularly equities.

Like the stock exchange, money can be made (or lost) on trading by investors and speculators in the foreign exchange market. Currencies can be traded at spot and foreign exchange options markets. The spot market represents current exchange rates, whereas options are derivatives of exchange rates.

== Manipulation of exchange rates ==
A country may gain an advantage in international trade if it controls the market for its currency to keep its value low, typically by the national central bank engaging in open market operations in the foreign exchange market, or through preventing the exchange of foreign currency for domestic notes. The People's Republic of China has been periodically accused of exchange rate manipulation, notably by Donald Trump during his 2016 presidential campaign and later in 2019, during his first term.

Other nations, including Iceland, Japan, Brazil, and so on have had a policy of maintaining a low value of their currencies in the hope of reducing the cost of exports and thus bolstering their economies. A lower exchange rate lowers the price of a country's goods for consumers in other countries, but raises the price of imported goods and services for consumers in the low value currency country.

This practice is known as "modern mercantilism", namely lowering the exchange rate below its real and fair price, to increase the competitiveness of trade and exports, and encourage economic growth. Rodrik said that this practice was quite effective in encouraging economic growth in developing countries but at the expense of other deficit countries.

In general, exporters of goods and services will prefer a lower value for their currencies, while importers will prefer a higher value.

== Exchange rate data aggregators ==
Exchange rate data aggregators are services that compile exchange rate data from multiple sources, including central banks, the interbank market, and commercial banks, to provide a consolidated view of prevailing rates.

Rates published by aggregators may differ from official central bank reference rates due to variations in data sources, update frequency, methodology, and whether they represent mid-market or retail rates.

== See also ==
- Black Wednesday
- Bureau de change
- Current account
- Currency strength
- Dual exchange rate
- Dynamic currency conversion
- Effective exchange rate
- Euro calculator
- Foreign exchange fraud
- Foreign exchange market
- Financial centre
- Functional currency
- Rational pricing § Foreign exchange
- Telegraphic transfer
- USD Index
- Index of economics articles
- List of countries by foreign-exchange reserves
