= Foreign exchange spot =

Financial agreement

A foreign exchange spot transaction (FX spot) is an agreement between two parties to buy one currency against selling another currency at an agreed price for settlement on the spot date. The exchange rate at which the transaction is done is called the spot exchange rate. As of 2010, the average daily turnover of global FX spot transactions reached nearly US$1.5 trillion, counting 37.4% of all foreign exchange transactions. FX spot transactions increased by 38% to US$2.0 trillion from April 2010 to April 2013.

== Settlement date ==
The standard settlement timeframe for foreign exchange spot transactions is T+2; i.e., two business days from the trade date. Notable exceptions are USD/CAD, USD/TRY, USD/PHP, USD/RUB, and offshore USD/KZT and offshore USD/PKR currency pairs, which settle at T+1. USD/COP settles T+0. The majority of SME FX payments are made through Spot FX, partially because businesses aren't aware of alternatives.

== Execution methods ==
Common methods of executing a spot foreign exchange transaction include the following:

- Direct – Executed between two parties directly and not intermediated by a third party. For example, a transaction executed via direct telephone communication or direct electronic dealing systems such as Reuters Conversational Dealing
- Electronic broking systems – Executed via automated order matching system for foreign exchange dealers. Examples of such systems are EBS and Reuters Matching 2000/2
- Electronic trading systems – Executed via a single-bank proprietary platform or a multibank dealing system. These systems are generally geared towards customers. Examples of multibank systems include Fortex Technologies, Inc., 360TGTX, FXSpotStream LLC, Integral, FXall, HotSpotFX, Currenex, LMAX Exchange, FX Connect, Prime Trade, Globalink, Seamless FX, and eSpeed
- Voice broker – Executed via telephone with a foreign exchange voice broker

== See also ==
- Foreign exchange market
- Foreign exchange option
- Foreign exchange derivative
- Financial instrument
- Foreign exchange aggregator
