= Spot–future parity =

Spot–future parity (or spot-futures parity) is a parity condition whereby, if an asset can be purchased today and held until the exercise of a futures contract, the value of the future should equal the current spot price adjusted for the cost of money, dividends, "convenience yield" and any carrying costs (such as storage). That is, if a person can purchase a good for price S and conclude a contract to sell it one month later at a price of F, the price difference should be no greater than the cost of using money less any expenses (or earnings) from holding the asset; if the difference is greater, the person has an opportunity to buy and sell the "spots" and "futures" for a risk-free profit, i.e. an arbitrage. Spot–future parity is an application of the law of one price; see also Rational pricing and #Futures.

The spot-future parity condition does not say that prices must be equal (once adjusted), but rather that when the condition is not met, it should be possible to sell one and purchase the other for a risk-free profit. In highly liquid and developed markets, actual prices on the spot and futures markets may effectively fulfill the condition. When the condition is consistently not met for a given asset, the implication is that some condition of the market prevents effective arbitration; possible reasons include high transaction costs, regulations and legal restrictions, low liquidity, or poor enforceability of legal contracts.

Spot–future parity can be used for virtually any asset where a future may be purchased, but is particularly common in currency markets, commodities, stock futures markets, and bond markets. It is also essential to price determination in swap markets.

== Mathematical expression ==
In the complete form:

$$F = Se^{(r+y-q-u)T}$$

Where:

F, S represent the cost of the good on the futures market and the spot market, respectively.
e is the mathematical constant for the base of the natural logarithm.
r is the applicable interest rate (for arbitrage, the cost of borrowing), stated at the continuous compounding rate.
y is the storage cost over the life of the contract.
q are any dividends accruing to the asset over the period between the spot contract (i.e. today) and the delivery date for the futures contract.
u is the convenience yield, which includes any costs incurred (or lost benefits) due to not having physical possession of the asset during the contract period.
T is the time period applicable (fraction of a year) to delivery of the forward contract.

This may be simplified depending on the nature of the asset applicable; it is often seen in the form below, which applies for an asset with no dividends, storage or convenience costs. Alternatively, r can be seen as the net total cost of carrying (that is, the sum of interest, dividends, convenience and storage). Note that the formulation assumes that transaction costs are insignificant.

Simplified form:

$$F = Se^{rT}$$

== Pricing of existing futures contracts ==
Existing futures contracts can be priced using elements of the spot-futures parity equation, where $K$ is the settlement price of the existing contract, $S_0$ is the current spot price and $P_0$ is the (expected) value of the existing contract today:

$$P_0 = S_0 - K e^{-rT}$$

which upon application of the spot-futures parity equation becomes:

$$P_0 = (F_0 - K)e^{-rT}$$

Where $F_0$ is the forward price today.

== See also ==
- Contango
- Backwardation
- Put–call parity
