= Theory of storage =

Model of commodities pricing developed by Holbrook Working

The Theory of Storage describes features observed in commodity markets:

When available supplies of the commodity in question are high, and the working inventories of commercial consumers of that commodity are accordingly held to a minimum,

- Futures prices tend to be in contango
- The volatility of spot and futures prices tend to be low, and futures premiums rise to the full cost of storage

When supplies are tight, and purchasing managers build production inventory levels to ensure availability,

- Futures prices tend toward backwardation
- The volatility of cash and the nearby futures prices rises with respect to that of the more distant futures contracts

The theory of storage was originally developed and described by Holbrook Working in 1933. It was extended by Nicholas Kaldor in 1939 (who introduced the notion of convenience yield), by Brennan in 1958 (who estimated demand and supply curves for storage), by Weymar in 1968 (who related convenience yield to the probability of inventory stockout) and by Schwartz in 1997 (modeling the yield as a mean-reverting stochastic process).
