= Oil-storage trade =

Market strategy

The oil-storage trade, also referred to as contango, is a market strategy in which large, often vertically-integrated oil companies purchase oil for immediate delivery and storage—when the price of oil is low— and hold it in storage until the price of oil increases. Investors bet on the future of oil prices through a financial instrument, oil futures in which they agree on a contract basis, to buy or sell oil at a set date in the future. Crude oil is stored in salt mines, tanks and oil tankers.

Investors can choose to take profits or losses prior to when the oil delivery date arrives or they can leave the contract in place and physical oil is delivered on the set date to an officially designated delivery point. In the United States, that is usually to Cushing, Oklahoma. When delivery dates approach, they close out existing contracts and sell new ones for future delivery of the same oil. The oil never moves out of storage. If the forward market is in "contango"—the forward price is higher than the current spot price—the strategy is very successful. While new tanks have been added in Cushing for a storage capacity of 6.6 million barrels, by March 2015 all the tanks were fully leased through 2015.

The strategy works because oil prices for delivery in the future are trading at a premium to those in the spot market - a market structure known in the industry as contango - with investors expecting prices to eventually recover from the near 60 percent slide in oil in the last seven months.

— Reuters 2015

In 2015, global capacity for oil storage was out-paced by global oil production and an oil glut occurred. Crude oil storage space became a tradable commodity with CME Group— which owns NYMEX— offering oil-storage futures contracts in March 2015. Traders and producers can buy and sell the right to store certain types of oil.

== Chronology ==
The concept started to be used by oil traders in the market in early 1990. But it was in 2007 through 2009 that the oil storage trade expanded. Many participants—including Wall Street giants, such as Morgan Stanley, Goldman Sachs, and Citicorp—turned sizeable profits simply by sitting on tanks of oil. By May 2007 Cushing's inventory fell by nearly 35% as the oil-storage trade heated up.

"The trend follows a spike in oil futures prices that has created incentives for traders to buy crude oil and oil products at current rates, sell them on futures markets and store them until delivery."

— Financial Times 2009

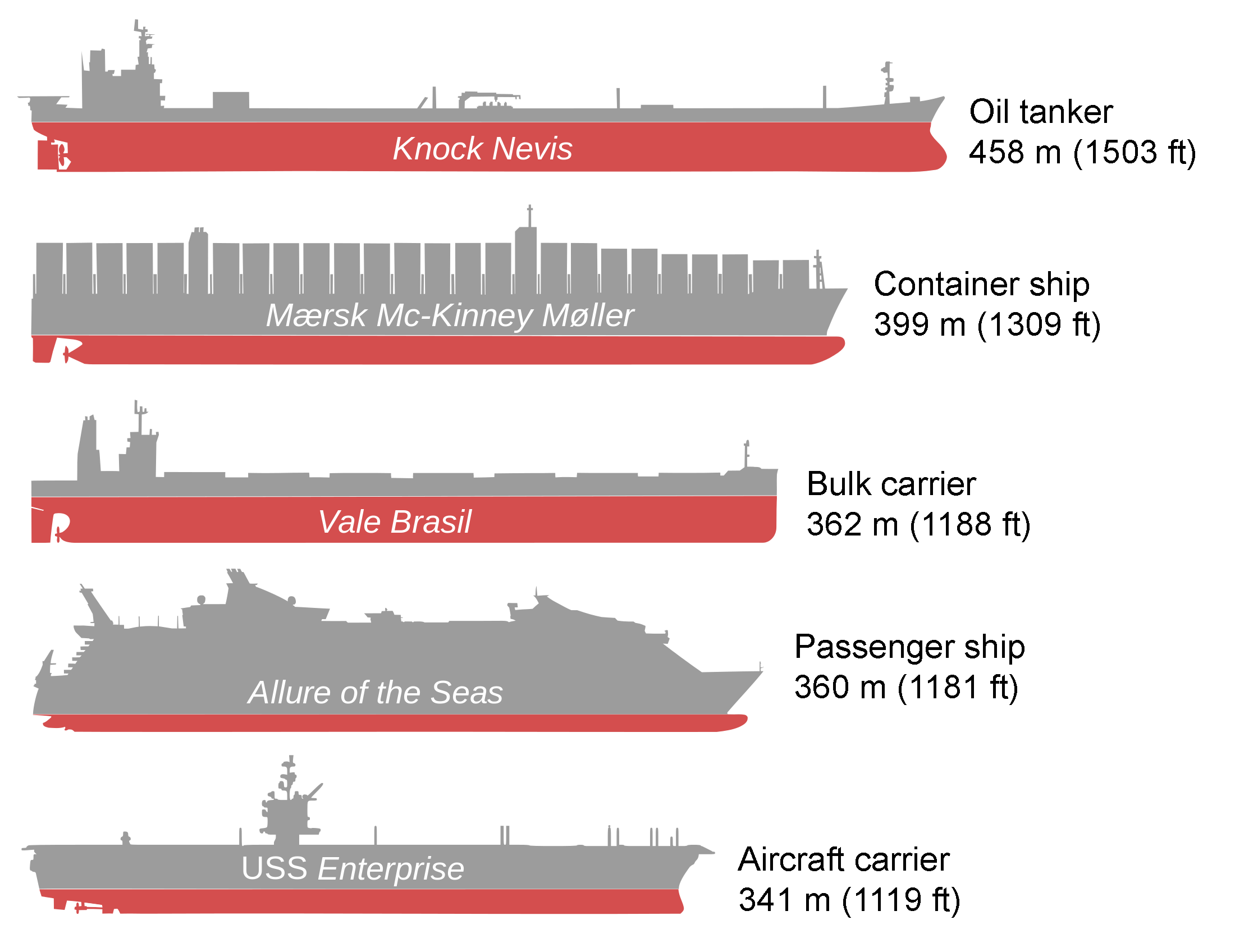
The Knock Nevis (1979-2010), a ULCC supertanker and the longest ship ever built.

By the end of October 2009 one in twelve of the largest oil tankers were being used more for temporary storage of oil than for transportation.

From June 2014 to January 2015, as the price of oil dropped 60 percent and the supply of oil remained high, the world's largest traders in crude oil purchased at least 25 million barrels to store in supertankers to try and make a profit in the future should prices rise. Trafigura, Vitol, Gunvor, Koch, Shell and other major energy companies began to book oil storage supertankers for up to 12 months. By 13 January 2015 at least 11 Very Large Crude Carriers (VLCC) and Ultra Large Crude Carriers (ULCC) were reported as booked with storage options, rising from around five vessels the prior week. Each VLCC can hold 2 million barrels.

By 5 March 2015, as oil production outpaced oil demand by 1.5 million barrels a day, storage capacity globally dwindled. Crude oil is stored in old salt mines, in tanks and on tankers. In the United States alone, according to data from the Energy Information Administration, U.S. crude-oil supplies were at almost 70% of the U.S. storage capacity, the highest supply to capacity ratio since 1935.

According to Bloomberg Business, the efficiency of newer shale oil wells that use hydraulic fracturing in the United States, combined with the $12 million upfront well drilling and construction costs, provide incentives to oil producers to continue to flood the already glutted market with under-priced oil in spite of crude oil storage limitations. Many less efficient and less productive older wells were shut down but these shale oil wells continue to increase production while making a profit in a market where crude oil is priced as low as $50 a barrel.

== Strategic Petroleum Reserve (SPR) ==
The United States Strategic Petroleum Reserve (SPR) is the world's largest supply of emergency crude oil—727 million barrels— stored in huge underground salt caverns along the coastline of the Gulf of Mexico. An emergency oil stockpile was recommended by several Presidents throughout the twentieth century, in 1944, in 1952, 1956 and in 1970. The SPR is a "deterrent to oil import cutoffs and a key tool of foreign policy" but it has rarely been used.

On October 20, 2014, a report by the U.S. Government Accountability Office (GAO) recommended reducing the size of the Reserve. According to the report, the amount of oil held in reserve exceeds the amount required to be kept on hand since the need for foreign imports of crude oil have decreased in recent years. The report said the U.S. Department of Energy agreed with the GAO’s recommendation.

== See also ==
- Contingent payment sales
