= Short-term European paper =

Financing instrument

United States Commercial Paper 2001 to 2007

Short-term European paper (STEP) is a short-term financing instrument and investment tool, and also a tool for the European Union to align the market standards and practices to promote the integration of the European market. The EU has accepted the STEP market as a non-regulated market due to collateral purposes; meanwhile, this will not influence the existing national and European legislative, regulatory and supervisory systems. As a short-term financial instrument, Short-Term European Paper could be issued by Treasury, banks, funds and so on, with a minimum amount of EUR 100,000. It is normally issued at a discount price, which is lower than face value, and matures within a year.

The market size for STEP is relatively large compared to some other types of commercial paper, measured based on the data of the amount of paper outstanding from 2018 to 2019 given by either treasuries or central banks. These entities report specific numbers on outstanding papers regularly.

Short-Term European Paper is a type of commercial or other short-term paper and bonds, they have very similar risks, such as inflation risk, credit risk, interest rate risk, currency risk and so on. The most popular one is credit risk, referring to default risk as well, which states that the issuers will probably default on the short-term paper and investors bear the losses. Furthermore, short-term paper is very similar to bonds in their nature. This is because the buyers of both the short-term paper and bonds are lending their money to the sellers in nature. The only difference is that the time to maturity of short-term paper is much shorter than that of bonds, normally it matures within nine months.

== Uses ==
As mentioned above, STEP acts as a financial instrument and an important tool for the EU, because they need it to align the European market standards and promote the integration of the European market. This is to simplify the market standards and merge the European market by using one standard rather than using different standards on different markets in Europe. Establishment of a market index for STEP is recommended as a useful tool to increase the degree of market transparency by providing investors with more available information so there is better protection on investors’ interests. They attach a lot of importance to this issue because this market is very crucial to the financial market and is relating to channelling of funds, investment and financing activities.

As a financing instrument, it can be issued by corporations or government to solve short-term fund problems; for large corporations, this tool can be used to raise funds to cover short-term problems, such as using the money raised from short-term paper to finance short-term accounts payable or meeting other short-term debts like interest payment.

Short-term paper would provide the government with the same functions, which is called Treasury Bills in financial terms. The difference between short-term paper issued by the government and any other institution or organisation is that short-term paper issued by the government or the Treasury is backed by the credit of the government, which is a lot more trustworthy and stronger than the credit of corporations because when the government could print money to pay investors back when their financial condition does not allow them to pay back using existing cash flows; hence, short-term paper issued by corporations will have to offer a higher yield to attract investors to compensate their relatively lower credit comparing to the government.

As an investment tool, investors can purchase STEP as an investment and sell it to earn the difference in prices or wait until the day that the paper matures.

== Current statistics and market conditions ==
From the data available on the website of the European Central Bank, there are a lot of Short-Term European Paper currently outstanding on the market, which is shown on the table below.

| 2018 | | | | | | | 2019 | | |
| June | July | Aug. | Sept. | Oct. | Nov. | Dec. | Jan. | Feb. | Mar. |
| 423.8 | 406.1 | 403.4 | 390.3 | 406.4 | 402.0 | 372.3 | 387.1 | 378.9 | 400.5 |

(Figure 1: total amount of STEP outstanding from 2018 to 2019, measured in Euros billions)

=== Index ===
Furthermore, an institution suggested constructing an index to make the market more transparent to investors because the task force believed that the success in US and French market is because of availability of statistics and market transparency, but the construction of the index for Short-Term European Paper has not been completed yet due to a list of problems. A factor that leads to pending construction of the STEP index is different settlement dates across countries in the European Union. For example, the French market trade in T+1, while some markets trade in T+0 and T+2.

=== Settlement dates ===
This refers to T+0, T+1, and T+2. For example, a country's market trades in T+0, a transaction happens on Tuesday can settle on Tuesday immediately. For T+1, a transaction happens on Tuesday, settlement will have to occur on Wednesday; and so on and so forth. This indicates settlement dates for various countries in the European countries. For example, Different settlement dates lead to huge difficulty to harmonise in the European market.

Different settlement dates could also make them difficult to be implemented because there is difficulty arise from different value dates. There are currently different classes of Short-Term European Paper issued on a same day settlement

=== Costs ===
According to the criterion of the STEP Market, the issuers of paper does not have to bear the costs associated with the official publication of statistics. The STEP market expressed the opinion that this cost should not be addressed to issuers, they wish this cost remains under control of the ACI-STEP Task Force.

== Histories ==
Previously, the Financial Market Association and the European Banking Association were in charge of promoting the STEP initiative, which is mainly aligning the European market standards and promoting the integration of the European money market and the development of the short-term paper market. In order to achieve this goal, two large institutions, Euribor ACI and European Money Market Institute, amended their statuses at that time and take on the responsibilities that associate with STEP and adopt to the STEP Market Convention. Under regulations of the STEP Market Convention created by Euribor ACI, issuers would have to put in place with any arrangements with entities, such as securities settlement system, the issuing and paying agents and so on, that are necessary to provide the eligible data provider with complete and accurate data for the production of statistics by the ECB.

Regulations and criteria of Short-Term European Paper were stipulated by the STEP Market Convention. The issuers of STEP programme must meet the requirements that were stipulated by the STEP Market Convention. Requirements like minimum amount of issuance and currency types were all stipulated by the STEP Market Convention. For criteria on credit rating, category "Rating 1" refers to the highest credit rating, which refers to A1, P1 or F1; "Rating 2" is high credit rating, referring to A2, P2 or F2; and "Rating 3" refer to medium credit rating, referring to A3, P3 or F3 . The STEP Market Convention sets the credit rating on STEP to ensure enough market transparency to protect investors. Furthermore, if an issue has different rating levels from different credit rating agencies, the issue will be rated by the lowest credit rating level.

Except for the Financial Market Association and the European Banking Association, Short-term paper task force was the committee of the STEP Market. This required them to finalise all issues associated with Short-Term European Paper and the Market Convention at that time. The STEP Market Committee was also responsible for subsequent updates of the information about the STEP Market, implementation of the STEP label, and promotion of the STEP Market to facilitate the alignment of the market standards and integration of the European money market.

Their further actions on preparing for STEP was considering the distribution of relevant obligations of the issuer and other parties. The ECB was also assigned some responsibilities and sanctioning powers on STEP. The ECB, as a watchdog, was mostly responsible for surveillance on the market and the granting of the STEP label. The ECB's sanctioning power was withdrawal of the STEP label. Furthermore, the ECB is also in charge of assessing data providers who are able to comply with the reporting instructions based on their capacity to comply with this instruction. Data providers would be required to report the total STEP volumes in the actual original currency, and the ECB will convert foreign currencies into euro with the end-of-day Euro exchange rage on the day.

With all the preparation works for STEP, their expectation of benefits of implementing STEP was improving the market efficiency and reduce the cost of credit through higher market transparency and alignments in the market standards; they also hoped that with higher market transparency, investors would be more willing to invest across borders, which in turn accelerate the process of the integration of the European Market and international capital market.

== Risks ==
The risks of Short-Term European Paper are similar to that of commercial paper and bonds because they are all short-term financing instrument and investment channel in nature. The risks of these financial instrument include credit risk, inflation, currency risk, interest rate risk and difference in reading financial statements. One example of possible severe outcome of risks in financial system is GFC in 2008, which leads to collapse of the financial system and personal wealth across the world, except for some countries that escaped from the GFC, like Australia and New Zealand, to a certain degree.

=== Credit risk ===
When buyers borrow money from the issuers, which means that they lend their money out, it is possible that the issuers do not pay the money back at the end when their profitability goes down due to reasons like worse economic environment or industry environment.

=== Inflation risk ===
A 1987 study stated that inflation may affect purchasing power if inflation rate is higher than the rate of return. Purchasing power may suffer in this case because the return is even smaller than the increases in general price level. More importantly, if the rate of inflation goes higher than the rate of return on the Short-Term European Paper, investors are actually losing money; because in theory, returns to investors are even lower than the increase in the general price level

=== Currency risk ===
Currency risk exists when holding a foreign currency investment or holding an investment that is denominated by a foreign currency. In this case, this risk only exists for investors outside of the Euro zone. For example, investors from the United States may consider investment in Europe, such as Short-Term European Paper, riskier than commercial paper in the US; in turn, European investors may consider the US commercial paper riskier than investment in Europe.

=== Interest rate risk ===
This risk has some impact on short-term paper; some investments may suffer from unexpected change in the interest rate. This is because the interest rate is the discount rate of calculating the present value of investment; if interest rate changes significantly, the value of investment may fluctuate a lot, which investors do not expect. However, this risk could be offset by purchasing interest rate swaps .

=== Difference in reading financial statements ===
Lastly, there are a few problems of associated with financial statements. There may be delay in the release of the financial statements leading to investors cannot read relevant information on time. Furthermore, there are different ways of presenting the balance sheet across different countries; this may lead to a relatively high degree of inconvenience of reading the financial statements for some specific countries with different methods of reading balance sheet and other types of financial statements.
