= Forward curve =

Concept in finance

The forward curve is a function graph in finance that defines the prices at which a contract for future delivery or payment can be concluded today. For example, a futures contract forward curve is prices being plotted as a function of the amount of time between now and the expiry date of the futures contract (with the spot price being the price at time zero). The forward curve represents a term structure of prices.

== Forward interest rate ==
A forward interest rate is a type of interest rate that is specified for a loan that will occur at a specified future date. As with current interest rates, forward interest rates include a term structure which shows the different forward rates offered to loans of different maturities. According to the unbiased expectations hypothesis, forward interest rates predict spot interest rates at the time the loan is actually made, but many analysts dispute whether this is true, as it ignores durational risk.

This figure is part of the lending & credit industry and is related as well to the "expectations theory" which states that forward interest rates can be used as forecasts for future interest rates. Investors expecting higher short-term interest rates are more likely to buy bonds maturing in the short term. If they were to park money into a long term debt they might not be able to make as much interest.

Finance analysts can refer to a graph of forward interest rate values over different time periods, the forward curve, to evaluate the time value of money.

== Price forward curve ==
A Price forward curve (short PFC) reflects specialties of the commodity market such as:

- Transporting commodities is costly and time-consuming.
- It is costly to store commodities - power storage is often prohibitively expensive.
- Many commodities show a strong seasonality, e.g. there is more natural gas demanded (for heating) in winter than in summer.

In order to fairly value and manage the profitability of energy products it is thus necessary to capture these seasonal price dynamics in a forward curve term-structure.

The contract duration of a futures contract is limited by definition and investors have to change their contract during the contract term. Price forward curves help to determine when to do that, two scenarios are possible:

1. If the PFC is ascending, i.e. future commodity-contracts will be more expensive than at the moment, this is called contango. The investor will have additional costs as they have to sell their futures to a lower price than what they have to invest for their new futures.
2. If the PFC is descending, it is a so-called backwardation and investors will make money by exchanging (rolling) their old futures contracts to new ones.

=== Hourly price forward curve ===
An hourly price forward curve (HPFC) is the construction of a forward curve at a resolution exceeding that known to the market and is as such able to capture the seasonalities of the electricity spot prices. The construction of an HPFC can be based on the combination of two approaches. A statistical approach examines how spot prices have moved in the past. A fundamental model suggests that the price is set purely by supply and demand (respectively, fuel prices on the merit order curve, and load).
