= Holbrook Working =

American economist and statistician (1895–1985)

- Born: February 5, 1895; Fort Collins, Colorado, US
- Died: October 5, 1985 (aged 90)

Academic background
- Education: University of Wisconsin–Madison

Holbrook Working (February 5, 1895 – October 5, 1985) was an American professor of economics and statistics at Stanford University's Food Research Institute known for his contributions on hedging, on the theory of futures prices, on an early theory of market maker behavior, and on the theory of storage (including the Working curve which plots the difference between short term and long term grain futures prices against current inventory).

== Biography ==
He was born in Fort Collins, Colorado, on February 5, 1895.

Working earned his Ph.D. in Agricultural Economics from the University of Wisconsin–Madison in 1921. He taught at Cornell University and the University of Minnesota before he joined Stanford's Food Research Institute in 1925. His younger brother Elmer Working made a major contribution on the identification problem for demand curves in econometrics, with which Holbrook Working was also involved.

Working disagreed with Keynes's backwardation theory of futures prices, which argued that short hedgers (farmers) drive down futures prices because of their demand for price insurance. Working argued that there could be hedgers on both sides of the market and that hedging was essentially not a risk reduction technique, but "speculation in the basis" which allows informed traders and commodity dealers to profit from their knowledge of future changes in the difference between futures and spot prices.

He was a founding member of the Econometric Society and was elected a Fellow of the American Agricultural Economics Association, the American Statistical Association, and the American Association for the Advancement of Science. In 1981 he was awarded the Wilks Memorial Award by the American Statistical Association.

He died on October 5, 1985, in Santa Clara, California.

== See also ==
- Working–Hotelling procedure

== Notable papers ==
- Working, Holbrook (August 1925). "The statistical determination of demand curves". The Quarterly Journal of Economics. 39 (4): 503–543. doi:10.2307/1883264. JSTOR 1883264.
- Working, Holbrook (March 1928). "Business cycles: the problem and its setting, by Wesley C. Mitchell (book review)". Journal of the American Statistical Association. 23 (161): 89–109. doi:10.1080/01621459.1928.10503002.
- Working, Holbrook; Hotelling, Harold (March 1929). "Applications of the theory of error to the interpretation of trends". Journal of the American Statistical Association. 24 (165A): 73–85. doi:10.1080/01621459.1929.10506274.
- Working, Holbrook (March 1934). "A random-difference series for use in the analysis of time series". Journal of the American Statistical Association. 29 (185): 11–24. doi:10.1080/01621459.1934.10502683.
- Working, Holbrook (October 1935). "Differential price behavior as a subject for commodity price analysis". Econometrica. 3 (4): 416–427. doi:10.2307/1905633. JSTOR 1912225.
- Working, Holbrook (June 1953). "Futures trading and hedging". The American Economic Review. 43 (3). American Economic Association: 314–343. JSTOR 1811346.
- Working, Holbrook (November 1953). "Hedging reconsidered". American Journal of Agricultural Economics. 35 (4): 544–561. doi:10.2307/1233368. JSTOR 1233368.
- Working, Holbrook (June 1962). "New concepts concerning futures markets and prices". The American Economic Review. 52 (3). American Economic Association: 413–459. JSTOR 1810553.
- Working, Holbrook (1967). "Tests of a theory concerning floor trading on commodity exchanges". Stanford University's Food Research Institute. 7 (s). AgEcon search: 5–48.
