= Interactive Energy =

Swiss energy company

Interactive Energy AG
- Interactive Energy AG, 2015
- Trade name: Interactive Energy AG
- Company type: Privately held company
- Industry: Agricultural products Soft commodities Natural gas Electric power Coal; Crude oil Petroleum products
- Founded: May 28, 2015; 11 years ago
- Founder: Ruben Katsobashvili
- Headquarters: Lucerne, Switzerland
- Number of locations: London and Hong Kong
- Area served: Worldwide
- Key people: Jose Luis Aneas Fernandez
- Products: Physical commodities, marketing & logistics
- Services: Trading & Supplying
- Parent: Interactive Energy HK Limited
- Website: www.inte-energy.com

Interactive Energy AG is an energy and commodities company that carries out physical trading, logistics and distribution, complemented by oil refining, shipping, terminals exploration and production, power generation, and mining.

The company trades in and distribute physical commodities sourced from third-party producers. It also provides processing, storage, logistics and other services to commodity producers and consumers. Their customer base is highly diversified, with a high proportion of long-term commercial relationships. The business model of the company covers a wide range of products, activities, and locations.

Customers may register and trade with an Interactive Energy mobile app which also provides real-time pricing, market data and news, a history of their transactions, P&L information, and a tracking capability to monitor the shipment of the physical commodity. The company was founded in Switzerland in 2015, and has offices in Lucerne, London, and Hong Kong.

== History ==
Interactive Energy AG is a joint stock corporation completely financed by Ruben Katsobashvili, a Russian investor who lives in Moscow who has been active in different commodity sectors, notably in the petroleum industry in Russia. Katsobashvili was active with the Ben brothers in Telecoms, wholesalers in Europe.

Jose Luis Fernandez, born on 15 March 1961, became the group director of Interactive Energy AG in May 2015.

== Legal legislative principles and texts ==
The company follows the legal responsibilities of EU law and is compliant with the relevant national and EU legislative texts for different resources including electricity, natural gas, and energy efficiency.

Interactive Energy AG earned the Energy Efficiency Certificate for being CO_{2}-neutral, and the company has a certificate for achieving balance by engaging in CO_{2}-reducing projects.

== Operations ==
As of 1 June 2015 the company structure and its services have been categorized into different major sectors and five selling and market organizations (SMOs)

== Sectors ==
- Agricultural Products
- Alumina
- Carbon Emissions
- Chemicals
- Coal
- Crude Oil
- Ethanol
- Fuel oil
- Gasoline
- Iron ore
- LNG
- LPG
- Methanol
- Middle Distillates
- Naphtha
- Natural gas
- Oil Production & Demand
- Power
- Soft Commodities
- Sugar

=== SMOs ===
Corporate Headquarters

- Lucerne
- Switzerland

Others

- London, UK
- Europe
- North and South America
- Hong Kong
- Far East

=== Major producers ===
- Russia
- Colombia
- United States
- South Africa
- Indonesia
- Australia

Future Functional Areas

- Beijing
- Singapore
- Mumbai
- EU

== Management and staff ==
The board of directors of Interactive Energy AG as of 2015 included Ruben Katsobashvili and Jose Luis Aneas Fernandez and consists of the chairman, the CEO and several non-executive directors.

The board manages the sales, logistics, trading, origination and operation activities for all kinds of trading and financial projects from all over the world, principally in the European countries.

== Major functions ==
The business has major activities which include physical trading, marketing and logistics, and risk advisory services.

== Online market data ==
The company displays regular and updated online data entries for trading to help investors make decisions according to the market environment.
