= Forward rate =

Future yield on a bond

The forward rate is the future yield on a bond. It is calculated using the yield curve. For example, the yield on a three-month Treasury bill six months from now is a forward rate.

== Forward rate calculation ==
To extract the forward rate, we need the zero-coupon yield curve.

We are trying to find the future interest rate $r_{1,2}$ for time period $(t_1, t_2)$, $t_1$ and $t_2$ expressed in years, given the rate $r_1$ for time period $(0, t_1)$ and rate $r_2$ for time period $(0, t_2)$. To do this, we use the property, following from the arbitrage-free pricing of bonds, that the proceeds from investing at rate $r_1$ for time period $(0, t_1)$ and then reinvesting those proceeds at rate $r_{1,2}$ for time period $(t_1, t_2)$ is equal to the proceeds from investing at rate $r_2$ for time period $(0, t_2)$.

$r_{1,2}$ depends on the rate calculation mode (simple, yearly compounded or continuously compounded), which yields three different results.

Mathematically it reads as follows:

=== Simple rate ===
$$(1+r_1t_1)(1+ r_{1,2}(t_2-t_1)) = 1+r_2t_2$$

Solving for $r_{1,2}$ yields:

Thus $r_{1,2} = \frac{1}{t_2-t_1}\left(\frac{1+r_2t_2}{1+r_1t_1}-1\right)$

The discount factor formula for period (0, t) $\Delta_t$ expressed in years, and rate $r_t$ for this period being $DF(0, t)=\frac{1}{(1+r_t \, \Delta_t)}$, the forward rate can be expressed in terms of discount factors: $r_{1,2} = \frac{1}{t_2-t_1}\left(\frac{DF(0, t_1)}{DF(0, t_2)}-1\right)$

=== Yearly compounded rate ===
$$(1+r_1)^{t_1}(1+r_{1,2})^{t_2-t_1} = (1+r_2)^{t_2}$$

Solving for $r_{1,2}$ yields :

$$r_{1,2} = \left(\frac{(1+r_2)^{t_2}}{(1+r_1)^{t_1}}\right)^{1/(t_2-t_1)} - 1$$

The discount factor formula for period (0,t) $\Delta_t$ expressed in years, and rate $r_t$ for this period being $DF(0, t)=\frac{1}{(1+r_t)^{\Delta_t}}$, the forward rate can be expressed in terms of discount factors:

$$r_{1,2}=\left(\frac{DF(0, t_1)}{DF(0, t_2)}\right)^{1/(t_2-t_1)}-1$$

=== Continuously compounded rate ===
$$e^{r_2 \cdot t_2} = e^{r_1 \cdot t_1} \cdot \ e^{r_{1,2} \cdot \left(t_2 - t_1 \right)}$$

Solving for $r_{1,2}$ yields:

STEP 1→ $e^{r_2 \cdot t_2} = e^{r_1 \cdot t_1 + r_{1,2} \cdot \left(t_2 - t_1 \right)}$

STEP 2→ $\ln \left(e^{r_2 \cdot t_2} \right) = \ln \left(e^{r_1 \cdot t_1 + r_{1,2} \cdot \left(t_2 - t_1 \right)}\right)$

STEP 3→ $r_2 \cdot t_2 = r_1 \cdot t_1 + r_{1,2} \cdot \left(t_2 - t_1 \right)$

STEP 4→ $r_{1,2} \cdot \left(t_2 - t_1 \right) = r_2 \cdot t_2 - r_1 \cdot t_1$

STEP 5→ $r_{1,2} = \frac{ r_2 \cdot t_2 - r_1 \cdot t_1}{t_2 - t_1}$

The discount factor formula for period (0,t) $\Delta_t$ expressed in years, and rate $r_t$ for this period being $DF(0, t)=e^{-r_t\,\Delta_t}$, the forward rate can be expressed in terms of discount factors:

$$r_{1,2} = \frac{\ln \left(DF \left(0, t_1 \right)\right) - \ln \left(DF \left(0, t_2 \right)\right)}{t_2 - t_1}
= \frac{- \ln \left( \frac{ DF \left(0, t_2 \right)}{ DF \left(0, t_1 \right)} \right)}{t_2 - t_1}$$

$r_{1,2}$ is the forward rate between time $t_1$ and time $t_2$.

$r_k$ is the zero-coupon yield for the time period $(0, t_k)$, (k = 1,2).

== Related instruments ==
- Forward rate agreement
- Floating rate note

== See also ==
- Forward price
- Spot rate
