= Ruben Katsobashvili =

Russian businessman (born 1933)

Ruben Katasobashvili
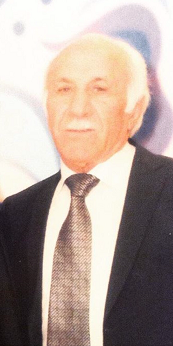
- Born: Georgia
- Occupation: Billionaire commodities trader

Ruben Katsobashvili (born February 20, 1933) is a Russian businessman who is a member of the board of directors of Interactive Energy AG, a company specialising in commodity trading (energy, metals & minerals, and soft commodities). He currently lives in Moscow.

== Early life ==
Katsobashvili was born in February 1933 in Georgia to a Jewish family. He is the son of Samuel, a Russian by ethnicity, who was a dentist, and Sara, an Italian. His family lived in Russia.

Katsobashvili has expertise in chess, and has won many prizes in Russia.

He graduated with a bachelor's degree in Economy & Government National Economy from Tbilisi University. He has also done PhD in Computer Science from the University of Moscow.

The languages he knows are Russian and Georgian.

== Career ==
Katsobashvili has spent around 30 years in the energy sector in Georgia and Russia. In some of the sectors, he is considered to be a veteran. He has been involved in strategic planning, implementation guiding, and overseeing the firms through substantial change management in which strategic leadership is applied. He has also rekindled abortive businesses.

He is the CEO of Nefti Saqartvelo, a company providing energy-related services, specializing in transportation and logistics and with the turnover of $4 billion. He shared his ideas and worked hard for the development of the company's strategy, implementing short and long term plans while ensuring that the effective internal controls and information management systems were in place.

He is also the founder of RUB oil and Gas consulting, a private consulting company which was bought by Olaf & MarcKlarenco in 2010. He came up with management and leadership while executing a strategic plan, where he analyzed, reviewed, and recommended acquisition opportunities to accelerate growth of the clients. In the energy sector, he also worked as a private advisor for partners and customers involved in dealing in oil and gas. He advised them to meet their performance investment objectives, increasing profits, market shares and return on investment.

== Ventures ==
The Interactive Energy AG is a company that deals in energy and commodity. The core of the business lies in logistics, physical trading and distribution. They take the physical commodities from third party producers and distribute those accordingly. Katsobashvili completely finances this project and is one of the driving forces behind the establishment of this company. He has helped to grow the company in a short period.

Katsobashvili founded RUB Oil and Gas consulting, a private consulting firm which was later sold to Olaf & MarcKlarenco in 2010.

== Global Witness allegations ==
According to non-governmental organization Global Witness, Katsobashivili is unlikely to be the source of investment funds for the Democratic Republic of the Congo projects. Global Witness claims he is not wealthy, drives a second-hand car, and lives in a modest property. It claims the Wikipedia page for Katsobashivili (i.e., this page) "was written by an employee of his own company" and "seems fabricated".

== Business career ==
- Nefti Sakartvelo Ltd., Tbilisi, F.S.U. (Georgia) (1987–1991): CEO of the company
- RUB Oil and Gas Consulting (1992–2010): founder of the company
- Private advisor to Previous Partners and Customers (2010–present): kept in touch with clients to understand their requirements, coming up with financial plans, implementing approved plans, etc.
- Private businessman (1992–2010)
- R.K.A. Igravil, Moscow (2000–2006): took care of operational and strategic activities
- Maraka Development and Investment Ltd. (1994–2013)
