= 988 transaction =

US tax terminology

A 988 transaction is a transaction described in section 988(c)(1) of the Internal Revenue Code in the United States of America. This transaction occurs when a taxpayer enters into or acquires any debt instrument, forward contract, futures contract, option, or similar financial instrument held in a non-functional currency. The rules for 988 transactions do not apply to any regulated futures contract or non-equity options which would be marked to market under 26 USCA § 1256 (1256 contract) if held on the last day of the taxable year.

== History ==
The provisions covering 988 transactions were enacted as part of the Tax Reform Act of 1986.

== Application ==
The foreign currency gain or loss on a 988 transaction is treated as ordinary income or loss unless an election is made to treat it as a capital gain or loss.

== See also ==
- International taxation
- Foreign tax credit
