= Cost of carry =

Cost of holding a security or physical commodity

The cost of carry or carrying charge is the cost of holding a security or a physical commodity over a period of time. The carrying charge includes insurance, storage and interest on the invested funds as well as other incidental costs. In interest rate futures markets, it refers to the differential between the yield on a cash instrument and the cost of the funds necessary to buy the instrument.

If long, the cost of carry is the cost of interest paid on a margin account. Conversely, if short, the cost of carry is the cost of paying dividends, or rather the opportunity cost; the cost of purchasing a particular security rather than an alternative. For most investments, the cost of carry generally refers to the risk-free interest rate that could be earned by investing currency in a theoretically safe investment vehicle such as a money market account minus any future cash flows that are expected from holding an equivalent instrument with the same risk (generally expressed in percentage terms and called the convenience yield). Storage costs (generally expressed as a percentage of the spot price) should be added to the cost of carry for physical commodities such as corn, wheat, or gold.

== Formula ==
The cost of carry model expresses the forward price (or, as an approximation, the futures price) as a function of the spot price and the cost of carry.

$$F = S e^{(r+s-c)t}\,$$

where

$F$ is the forward price,
$S$ is the spot price,
$e$ is the base of the natural logarithms,
$r$ is the risk-free interest rate,
$s$ is the storage cost,
$c$ is the convenience yield, and
$t$ is the time to delivery of the forward contract (expressed as a fraction of 1 year).

The same model in currency markets is known as interest rate parity.

For example, a US investor buying a Standard and Poor's 500 e-mini futures contract on the Chicago Mercantile Exchange could expect the cost of carry to be the prevailing risk-free interest rate (around 5% as of November, 2007) minus the expected dividends that one could earn from buying each of the stocks in the S&P 500 and receiving any dividends that they might pay, since the e-mini futures contract is a proxy for the underlying stocks in the S&P 500. Since the contract is a futures contract and settles at some forward date, the actual values of the dividends may not yet be known so the cost of carry must be estimated.

== See also ==
- Carry (investment)
- Carrying charge
- Interest rate parity
- Covered interest arbitrage
- Spot-future parity
- Contango
- Demurrage currency
