= Spot date =

In finance, the spot date of a transaction is the normal settlement day when the transaction is carried out as soon as practical, i.e. "on the spot". This kind of transaction is called a "spot transaction" or simply "spot", and is often described as such in contrast to a transaction which is not settled immediately, such as a futures contract or a forward contract.

== Settlement date ==
The spot settlement date may be different for different types of financial transactions, based on market practice. For example, in the foreign exchange market, spot is normally two banking days forward for the currency pair traded.

Other settlement dates are also possible. Standard settlement dates are calculated from the spot date. For example, a one-month foreign exchange forward settles one month after the spot date—i.e., if today is 1 February, the spot date is 3 February and the one-month date is 3 March, assuming these dates are all business days. For a trade with two dates, such as a foreign exchange swap, the first date is usually taken as the spot date.

== See also ==
- Date rolling – Payment date terms in finance
- Day count convention – Calculation method for the accrual of interest
- Foreign exchange date conventions – Foreign exchange market
- Foreign exchange spot – Financial agreement
- International Monetary Market – One of four divisions of the CME Group
- Settlement date – Securities industry term
- Spot price – Contract to buy or sell a commodity, security or currency for immediate settlement
- T+2 – Physical exchange of securities or payment
- Trade date – Finance stubs
- Value date
