= Spot contract =

Contract to buy or sell a commodity, security or currency for immediate settlement

In finance, a spot contract, spot transaction, or simply spot, is a contract of buying or selling a commodity, security or currency for immediate settlement (payment and delivery) on the spot date, which is normally two business days after the trade date. The settlement price (or rate) is called spot price (or spot rate). A spot contract is in contrast with a forward contract or futures contract where contract terms are agreed now but delivery and payment will occur at a future date.

== Spot prices and future price expectations ==
Depending on the item being traded, spot prices can indicate market expectations of future price movements in different ways. For a security or non-perishable commodity (e.g. silver), the spot price reflects market expectations of future price movements. In theory, the difference in spot and forward prices should be equal to the finance charges, plus any earnings due to the holder of the security, according to the cost of carry model. For example, on a share the difference in price between the spot and forward is usually accounted for almost entirely by any dividends payable in the period minus the interest payable on the purchase price. Any other cost price would yield an arbitrage opportunity and riskless profit (see rational pricing for the arbitrage mechanics).

In contrast, a perishable or soft commodity does not allow this arbitrage – the cost of storage is effectively higher than the expected future price of the commodity. As a result, spot prices will reflect current supply and demand, not future price movements. Spot prices can therefore be quite volatile and move independently from forward prices. According to the unbiased forward hypothesis, the difference between these prices will equal the expected price change of the commodity over the period.

== Spot date ==
In finance, the spot date of a transaction is the normal settlement day when the transaction is done today. This kind of transaction is referred to as a spot transaction or simply spot.

The spot date may be different for different types of financial transactions. In the foreign exchange market, spot is normally two banking days forward for the currency pair traded. A transaction which has settlement after the spot date is called a forward or forward contract.

Other settlement dates are also possible. Standard settlement dates are calculated from the spot date. For example, a one-month foreign exchange forward settles one month after the spot date. I.e., if today is 1 February, the spot date is 3 February and the one-month date is 3 March (assuming these dates are all business days). For a trade with two dates, such as a foreign exchange swap, the first date is usually taken as the spot date.

== Examples ==
=== Bonds and swaps ===
A spot rate is the interest rate for a specific maturity, which is to be used for discounting the cash flows which occur at that date. An alternate statement of this: the rate of effective annual growth that equates the present value with the future value. The terminology is consistent with the above, in that the spot rate is related to the forward rate analogously.

A spot rate curve displays these rates over various maturities. Each security class will have its own curve (with the resultant credit spread – e.g. swaps vs government bonds – a function of increased credit risk). A zero rate curve or zero curve is the term structure of the yields-to-maturity of Zero-coupon bonds and maturities.

Note that a spot rate curve is not a curve of bond ytm or swap rates – which in fact are curves of currently trading prices of securities with various maturities (these would be: yield curve, swap curve, cash curve or coupon curve). Spot rates cannot be directly observed, prices can: spot rates are thus estimated from these prices via the bootstrapping method, and the result is the spot rate curve for the securities in question.

=== Commodity ===
A simple example: even if you know tomatoes are cheap in July and will be expensive in January, you cannot buy them in July and take delivery in January, since they will spoil before you can take advantage of January's high prices. The July price will reflect tomato supply and demand in July. The forward price for January will reflect the market's expectations of supply and demand in January. July tomatoes are effectively a different commodity from January tomatoes (contrast contango and backwardation).

== See also ==
- Spot market
- Forward contract
- Forward price
- Rational pricing
