= Market profile =

Charting technique in financial markets

A Market Profile is an intra-day charting technique (price vertical, time/activity horizontal) devised by J. Peter Steidlmayer, a trader at the Chicago Board of Trade (CBOT), ca 1959-1985. Steidlmayer was seeking a way to determine and to evaluate market value as it developed in the day time frame. The concept was to display price on a vertical axis against time on the horizontal, and the ensuing graphic generally is a bell shape--fatter at the middle prices, with activity trailing off and volume diminished at the extreme higher and lower prices. In this structure he recognized the 'normal', Gaussian distribution he had been introduced to in college statistics (3).

The Market Profile graphic was introduced to the public in 1985 as a part of a CBOT product, the CBOT Market Profile (CBOTMP1) (2). CBOTMP1 included the new Liquidity Data Bank (LDB) data; end-of-day clearings, all trade was categorized and identified by the class of trader in the pits ( (1) local, (2) commercial, (3) members filling for other members and (4) members filling orders for the public). The Profile was proposed as a visual organizing methodology in addition to these new data. CBOTMP1 advertised the Profile/LDB as the way to 'Improve Performance'. It is described as "the only variable-cost ticker service in the commodities industry."

The promotional material says the Profile is to be the link between the CBOT data and the market. A Profile graphic is to be used to tell "what the market is doing"; the LDB data is for finding the market's 'condition'. As a part of the data-display connection in CBOTMP1, the price of the peak cleared volume is identified as the Point of Control (POC). Following the normal distribution analogy, the central seventy percent of trading activity about POC (+/- one standard deviation) is termed the 'Value Area'.

Section Headings for "CBOT Market Profile, 1986" are:

- Using the CBOT Market Profile to Improve Performance
- The Profile: The link Between CBOT Data and the Market
- Part I What the Market is Doing: The Market Profile Graphic
- Part II The Condition of the Market: Liquidity Data Bank
- Appendix

In 1987, Professor Thomas P. Drinka of Western Illinois University launched the first Market Profile® course in academia. As of 2010, Western remains as the premiere and only academic institution to offer such a course as part of curriculum.

A new and expanded 335 page CBOT Market Profile manual, CBOTMP2, was released in 1991, (5). In this volume the first five sections are devoted to profile analysis. The last section discusses LDB data. Unlike CBOTMP1, there is no emphasis on a Market Profile ticker product. In the period 1985 - 1991 the profile concept caught on with the public (in one Chicago Tribune article Steidlmayer was identified as "the man who knows where the market is going").

In early 1986 Steidlmayer and Kevin Koy started Market Logic School to teach profile trading. Around the same time the CBOT gave up on marketing the Liquidity Data Bank directly to the public (CISCO Futures became their vendor). Public access to tick data increased greatly so that profiles could be constructed real-time intra-day (whereas the LDB data breaking out the category of participant at price was still generated at the end of day). It was becoming increasingly clear that pit trading's days were numbered. By 1991 it was obvious that the focus was on the profile technology and less on the database used to support the calculations. Hence the change in emphasis on the Profile vs the LDB data in CBOTMP2.

In both CBOTMP1 and CBOTMP2 'Market Profile' occurs in the name, but it is hard to find a definition of exactly what a Market Profile is. Many, many examples are given in both publications. A working definition from Mind Over Markets (9) is: "the market's price activity recorded in relation to time in a statistical bell curve". Added to this would be a definition of the price and the marker, a 'TPO' (time-price opportunity), with TPO defined in CBOTMP1 as: "opportunity created by the market at a certain price at a certain time". For example:

101150 A      A = 08:00 to 08:29
101125 AB     B = 08:30 to 08:50
101100  B     C = 09:00 to 09:29
101075  BC

Letters identify time, as does position (A's in one column, B's in the next, etc. A, B, C are TPO's (that price occurred).

Section Headings for "CBOT Market Profile, 1991"

- Reading the Market Profile Graphic
- Profiles for Long Term Trends
- Perception of Value Fuels Market Activity
- Market Profile Data and the Distribution Process
- Market Profile Tools to Support Trading Decisions
- Liquidity Data Bank Volume Analysis

Volume is said to identify signs of continuation or change, to infer the directional facilitation of trade, but "volume data, by itself, is meaningless". The reason given is that "it is essential to know what market participants are doing". Many 'profile readings' are shown in both CBOTMP1 and CBOTMP2, inferring who is trading what and what message they are sending. One method, apparently, is to see if volume is increasing to the upside or downside intra-day. The LDB data discussed here is end of day. Some time later the CBOT began releasing clearings during the day on the half hour. These clearings when compared to tick data indicate an approximately half hour delay. It is not explained just how reading trade facilitation with delayed data is effected.

At the beginning of the day the first hour of trading creates a range (the Initial Balance). Then, as additional information on the day's trading continued, certain chart formations, called day types, are recognized. These formations have names (1), (2), such as 'neutral day', non-trend day, trend day, etc. Another concept, the 'third standard deviation' or Steidlmayer Distribution has been discussed (1) possibly in support of day types. The Steidlmayer Distribution begins as the current, equilibrium, distribution moves out of equilibrium (1, p 175).

== Objective and Subjective Elements in a Market Profile ==
The objective part of a Market Profile is the profile display. This comes directly from the data itself, creating TPO's (either from LDB or tick data (11)). A key element is the Initial Balance, the range and price location of the first hour of trading.

Subjectively, Steidlmayer recognized a few behavior patterns or 'Day Types' in the early part of the day (tied to the Initial Balance), defining 3 types (CBOTMPG1, Pg 12) and later, 4 (CBOTMP2, PG 4, 12). Each type developed certain characteristics, telling which sort of trader is in control (short term traders, longer traders, etc.). Mind Over Markets lists 9 day types (9). See reference 10 for a discussion of this point.

Day types, of course is chart reading and forecasting. The well known problem with interpreting charts is the multitude of potential interpretations for most any chart. Mastery theory offers some hope for traders who are willing to spend the time and effort in understanding the auction market environment. But that path can well take 10,000 hours of training. A large part of CBOTMPG1 and more particularly, CBOTMPG2, is devoted to 'reading' the profile as it develops throughout the day. CBOTMPG1 suggests that it will take six months to a year to learn the Market Profile methodology.

== Limitations on Market Profile ==
1. The primary condition for a valid profile is a normal, equilibrium distribution. If the market is not in equilibrium there is no valid POC or standard deviation. A simple visual examination will often be enough to certify that the distribution is abnormal: the day may have two distributions (two peaks) or the trading may be directional, etc. Although unfit, non-equilibrium data can still be operated on as usual by a computer program, the results are likely meaningless or misleading. Most traders who use Profiles seem oblivious to the requirement for normality.

2. Even in overall equilibrium markets there can be days in which the market prices jump out of bounds (false breakouts) and then return later in the day or the next day. A single day's Profile does not provide a reliable measure of market condition (3). Research indicates that a three-day measure is the minimum preferred (4).

3. Markets have changed since 1985/1991. Pits are approaching extinction. In 1985 and earlier, trading by members in the pits was by open outcry; commercial traders were in view and the 'trade' dominated the markets. Today (2011) there are few pits and public traders dominate the trading volume. Certainly, an intelligent and alert trader like Steidlmayer in the pit had much more to go on than just the Profile graphic available today.

4. Profiles were defined to use LDB data. Point of Control is the price at maximum cleared volume. Few traders today have access to LDB data. Research on cleared volume being substituted by TPO's found the TPO's were reliable in locating the Point of Control (6, 7). The Meta-Profile Point of Control from TPO's is not an exact duplicate of the Market Profile Point of Control (13). Users of the Meta-Profile need to be aware of the differences and their potential differences in trading.

5. The time which is spent on individual prices does not necessary imply that the same amount of volume took place there. For more precise results, it is sometimes advisable to use Volume Profile, which is based purely on volume and price and does not take time into account at all.
