= Soft commodity =

Raw materials from agricultural production

Soft commodities, or softs, are commodities such as coffee, cocoa, sugar, corn, wheat, soybean, fruit and livestock. The term generally refers to commodities that are grown, rather than mined; the latter (such as oil, copper and gold) are known as hard commodities.

Soft commodities play a major part in the futures market. They are used by farmers wishing to lock-in the future prices of their crops, by commercial purchasers of the products, and by speculative investors seeking a profit. The adjective "soft" is occasionally only applied to products that are classified as largely tropical, such coffee, chocolate, sugar, cotton, and orange juice.

Soft commodities have been known to adopt a backwardation trend until the late 1990s when futures were actively traded. Speculation and investment requirements later shaped the common contango trend.

== See also ==
- Commodification
- Commodity status of animals
