= Elmer Working =

American econometrician

Elmer Joseph Working (1900 to 1968) was an American econometrician. He was an early discoverer and the first to suggest a solution to the identification problem in applied econometrics. This suggested solution involved the use of economic theory to pre-adjust the data being examined. In his 1927 paper he focused on the relative stability of the demand and supply curves - arguing "Whether a demand or a supply curve is obtained may also be affected by the nature of the corrections [e.g., trend removal, deflation] applied to the original data. The corrections may be such as to reduce the effect of the shifting of the demand schedules without reducing the effect of the shifting of the supply schedules. In such a case the curve obtained will approximate a demand curve, even though the original demand schedules fluctuated fully as much as did the supply schedules. By intelligently applying proper refinements, and making corrections to eliminate separately those factors which cause demand curves to shift and those factors which cause supply curves to shift, it may be possible even to obtain both a demand curve and a supply curve .. . from the same original data". (p.222 Working (1927) cited in Goldberger (1972) p. 986) His 1934 Econometrica article was an early statement of the benefits of using econometrics for not only economic theory but also for addressing its policy implications.

== Selected publications ==
- Working, E. J. (1927). What do statistical “demand curves” show?. The Quarterly Journal of Economics, 41(2), 212-235.
- Working, E. J. (1932). Indications of changes in the demand for agricultural products. Journal of Farm Economics, 14(2), 239-256.
- Working, E. J. (1934). Demand studies during times of rapid economic change. Econometrica: Journal of the Econometric Society, 140-151.
- Working, E. J. (1955). How Much Progress Has Been Made in the Study of the Demand for Farm Products?. Journal of Farm Economics, 37(5), 968-974.
