= Value date =

In finance, value date is the date when the value of an asset that fluctuates in price is determined. The value date is used when there is a possibility for discrepancies due to differences in the timing of asset valuation. It usually applies to forward currency contracts, options and other derivatives, interest payable or receivable.

The value date can also mean:

- the date when the entry to an account is considered effective in accounting.
- the delivery date of funds traded in banking. For spot transactions it is the future date on which the trade is settled. In the case of a spot foreign exchange trade it is normally two days after a transaction is agreed upon.
- the date the tax payment would coincide with the payment date in online banking, and retail payment gateways online.

== See also ==
- Settlement date
- Spot date
- Trade date
- Spot contract
- T+2
