= Financial market theory of development =

Economic theory

Financial market theory of development is an economic theory to use private flows of capital in new stock markets to encourage domestic economic development in developing countries. The theory was put forward by the World Bank's World Development Report for 2000.

The theory states foreign investors should have access to "well-regulated" financial markets which would provide the "surest path" to economic development. Businesses in low-income countries would gain direct access to the private capital from industrialized countries. Companies in developing countries would not have to rely on loans or aid that are negotiated through political means and receive capital directly from private investors. This would free capital from exposure to inefficient or corrupt government structures, unleash local entrepreneurial potential and hopefully improve economic growth. Instead of relying on the slow process of domestic capital accumulation, they can sell equity to or borrow from foreign investors and spur economic development faster.

The theory has its criticisms, for example Ajit Singh, Professor Emeritus of economics at Cambridge University, states that stock market development is not an essential progression for the development of a country's financial development. He points out the post-World War II period countries of Germany, Italy, Japan, Korea and Taiwan which were able to industrialize and achieve "economic miracles with little assistance from the stock market"

Countries creating stock markets between 1960 and 2009
1960	Nigeria
1961	Taiwan
1964	Malaysia
1966	Iran
1968	Jamaica
1969	Ecuador, Tunisia
1974	Côte d'Ivoire, Thailand
1976	Jordan, Costa Rica
1977	Indonesia, Paraguay
1979	Bolivia
1980	Fiji
1981	Trinidad and Tobago
1984	Saudi Arabia, Kuwait
1985	Iceland
1987	Bahrain, Barbados
1988	Oman
1989	Ghana, Mauritius, Guatemala, Yugoslavia
1990	Honduras, China, Soviet Union, Malta, Swaziland, Panama, Hungary
1991	Croatia, Poland, Bulgaria
1992	Czechoslovakia, Ukraine, Namibia, Lithuania, Mongolia, El Salvador
1993	Armenia, Latvia, Bhutan, Cyprus
1994	Botswana, Uzbekistan, Nepal
1995	Kyrgyz Republic, Malawi, Moldova, Zambia, Macedonia, Romania, Estonia
1996	Lebanon
1997	Uganda, Kazakhstan, Qatar
1998	Tanzania
1999	Georgia, Algeria
2000	United Arab Emirates, Papua New Guinea, Azerbaijan, Vietnam, Bahamas
2002	Maldives
2003	Guyana
2004	Iraq
2005	Cape Verde
2006	Suriname
2007	Libya
2009	Syria
In preparation as of 2009: Cambodia, Lao, Albania, Afghanistan

== Historical perspective ==
In 1950, there were 49 countries with stock exchanges, 24 were in Europe and 14 in former British colonies such as the United States, Canada and Australia. Their usefulness was seen as limited to only the wealthier countries in which they resided. Developing countries had low levels of savings and limited means to attract foreign capital; stock markets played an insignificant role in their economic growth before the 1980s. Funding for economic capital came primarily from foreign aid, state-to-state from advanced industrial countries to developing economies during the 1950s and 1960s.

During the 1970s, there was an increase in private bank long-term lending to foreign states that nearly equalled state aid, and as Keynesian ideas came into disrepute due to stagflation. In 1982, when Mexico suspended its external debt service, it marked the beginning of the debt crisis throughout the developing world; banks severely limited lending to developing nations.

In response to the perceived failures of the development project and to the 1980s debt crisis, a market-based strategy of economic development was seen as the solution. Instead of bank-to-state lending or foreign aid, this model would use private investment in the private sector of developing countries. The International Monetary Fund (IMF) and the World Bank spread this idea through its imposition of Structural Adjustment Programs during the 1980s.

The IMF and the World Bank supported stock market development not solely on the grounds of ideology but rather that the stock market is a natural outgrowth of a developing financial sector as long-term economic growth proceeds and also as a criticism of early development efforts through Development Finance Institutes (DFI). These DFIs had difficulties during the 1970s economic crisis of the third world. Singh cites the World Development Report of 1989 that the poor performance of these DFIs was due to the "inefficiencies of these DFIs and the banked-based interventionist financial systems". The report arguedfor a restructuring of these systems to make them "voluntary, fiscally neutral and to being them as far as practicable under private ownership". A new term was coined, "emerging markets", for third world countries which would help legitimize stock markets as a method of economic development.

During the 1980s, developing countries enacted dramatic reforms to their financial systems through liberalisation to make their economies more market-oriented (financial de-repression), making capital easier to move around the world. From 1984 to 1995, global equity markets experienced an explosive growth and emerging equity markets experienced an even more rapid growth, taking on an increasingly larger share of this global boom. Between 1980 and 2005, 58 countries started stock exchanges. Overall capitalization rose from $4.7 trillion to $15.2 trillion globally, the share of emerging markets jumped from less than 4 to 13 percent in this period. Trading activity in these markets surged considerably: the value of shares traded in emerging markets climbed from less than three per cent of the $1.6 trillion world total in 1985 to 17 per cent of the $9.6 trillion shares traded in all world's exchanges in 1994.

As evidenced by the acommpagning table, from 1960 to about 1988, approximately one new exchange opened every year. However, in the following years, multiple exchanges opened up every year.

Stock markets of developing countries became major sources of foreign capital flows to developing countries. For example, Ajit Singh in his Financial Liberalisation, Stock markets and Economic Development, cited international equity flows of The Economist's 38 emerging markets increased from $3.3 billion in 1986 to $61.2 billion in 1993. This particular capital flow was different from the previous 20 years by the increasing role of foreign portfolio flow versus bank financing. These funds poured into developing countries through several routes as external liberalization increased; country or regional funds, direct purchase of developing countries stocks by industrial country investors, listing of developing countries securities on industrial country markets.

== Financial market theory of development ==
The use of private flows of capital and stock market creation began to shape into a new theory of development put forward by the World Bank's World Development Report for 2000. Foreign investors should have access to "well-regulated" financial markets which would provide the "surest path" to economic development. Businesses in low-income countries gain direct access to the private capital from industrialized countries. Companies in developing countries do not have to rely on loans or aid that are negotiated through political means and receive capital directly from private investors. This would free capital from exposure to inefficient or corrupt government structures, unleash local entrepreneurial potential and hopefully improve economic growth. This would encourage policy and corporate managers to make "future-oriented decisions about the governance of their economic system". Capital-deprived developing countries can craft policies to convince investors about the future prospects of their country. Instead of relying on the slow process of domestic capital accumulation, they can sell equity to or borrow from foreign investors and spur economic development faster. "Moreover, stock markets generate a wealth of intelligence through the operation of the price system, which helps guide decisions of both managers and investors. The benefits to investors are rooted in prospective growth rates unattainable in advanced economies and high returns matching the risks involved." This is known as the "financial market theory of development". There is an assumption that accompanies this theory; it implies that stock markets will improve economic growth to the degree based on how integrated they are into an "institutional matrix" that sends signals to decisions makers who would look for growth opportunities.

== Some criticism ==
Ajit Singh, Professor Emeritus of economics at Cambridge University, notes that stock markets are "potent symbols of capitalism but paradoxically capitalism often flourishes better without their hegemony". He states that stock market development is not an essential progression for the development of a country's financial development. He points out the post-World War II period countries of Germany, Italy, Japan, Korea and Taiwan which were able to industrialize and achieve "economic miracles with little assistance from the stock market". He ends his criticism with a quote from Keynes, "when the capital development of a country becomes the by-product of the activities of a casino, the job is likely to be ill-done".

== See also ==
- Outline of corporate finance

== Works cited ==
- Mohtadi, Hamid and Sumit Agarwal. Stock Market Development and Economic Growth Evidence from Developing Countries. University of Wisconsin-Milwaukee, 2001. University of Wisconsin-Milwaukee, Department of Economics. Web. 12 Feb 2013. https://pantherfile.uwm.edu/mohtadi/www/PA1-4-01.pdf
- Ross, Valerie (June 2011). "Developing Stock Exchanges in Developing Countries". Kellogg Insight. Kellogg School of Management, Northwestern University.
- Singh, Ajit (1993). "The Stock Market and Economic Development: Should Developing Countries Encourage Stock Markets?" (PDF). UNCTAD Review (4). Archived from the original (PDF) on 22 December 2014.
- Singh, Ajit (May 1997). "Financial Liberalisation, Stockmarkets and Economic Development". The Economic Journal. 107 (442): 771–782. doi:10.1111/j.1468-0297.1997.tb00042.x. JSTOR 2957801
- Weber, Klaus; Gerald F. Davis; Michael Lounsbury. "Policy as Myth and Ceremony? The Global Spread of Stock Markets, 1980-2005". Academy of Management Journal. 52 (6): 1319–1347. CiteSeerX 10.1.1.629.9982. doi:10.5465/amj.2009.47085184. S2CID 1649056.
