= Contango =

Situation when futures prices are above the expected spot price at maturity

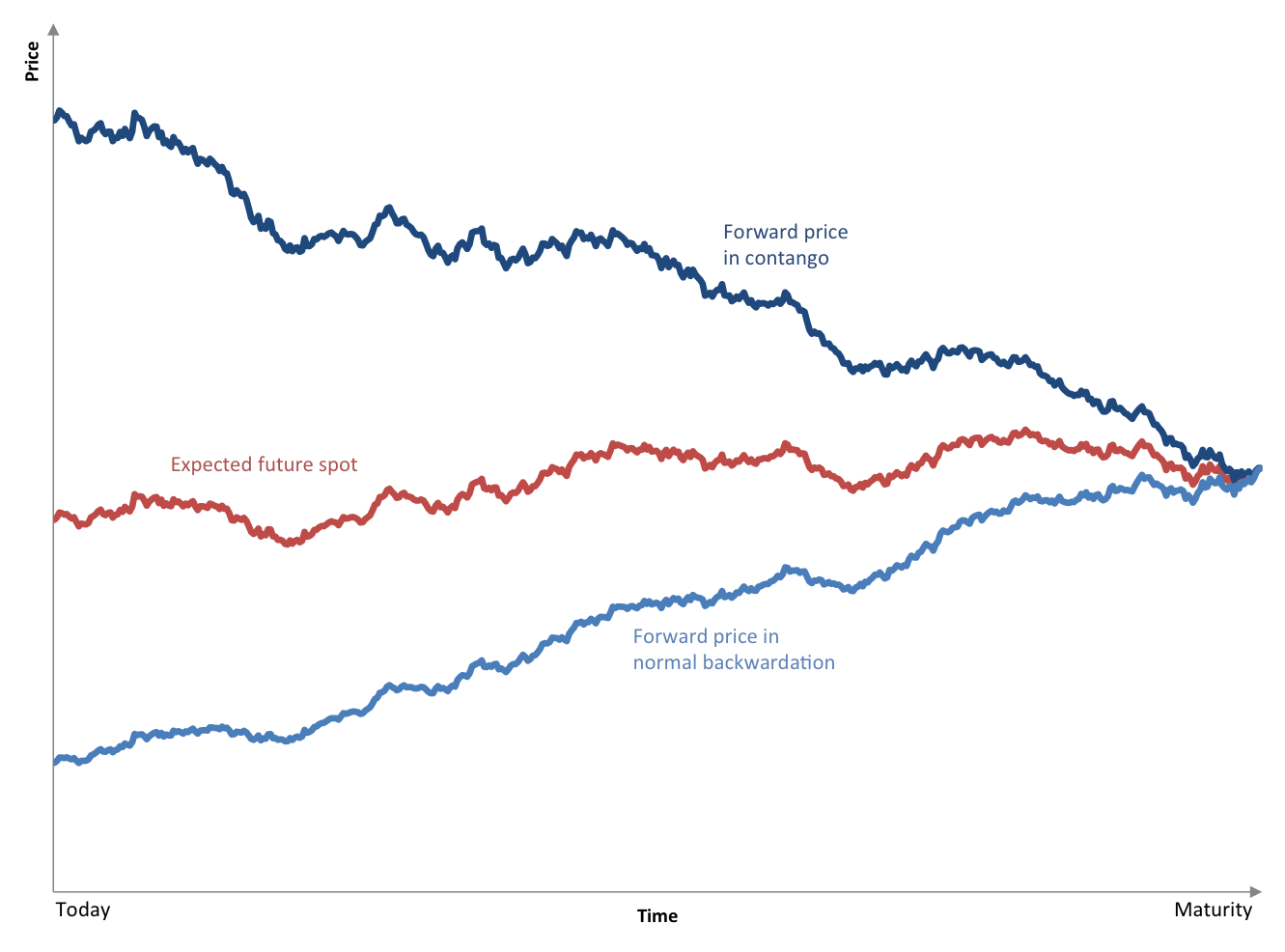
This graph depicts how the price of a single forward contract will typically behave through time in relation to the expected future price at any point in time. A futures contract in contango will normally decrease in value until it equals the spot price of the underlying commodity at maturity. This graph does not show the forward curve (which plots against maturities on the horizontal).

Contango is a situation in which the futures price (or forward price) of a commodity is higher than the spot price. In a contango situation, arbitrageurs or speculators are "willing to pay more for a commodity [to be received] at some point in the future than to purchase the commodity immediately. This may be due to people's desire to pay a premium to have the commodity in the future rather than paying the costs of storage and carry costs of buying the commodity today." On the other side of the trade, hedgers (commodity producers and commodity holders) are happy to sell futures contracts and accept the higher-than-expected returns. A contango market is also known as a normal market or carrying-cost market.

The opposite market condition to contango is known as backwardation. "A market is 'in backwardation' when the futures price is below the spot price for a particular commodity. This is favorable for investors who have long positions since they want the futures price to rise to the level of the current spot price".

In industry parlance, contango may refer to the situation when futures prices (or forward prices) are above the current spot price, or a far-dated futures price is above a near-dated futures price, and the expectation is for the spot price to rise to the futures price at maturity, or the near-dated futures price to rise to the far-dated futures price.

The futures or forward curve would typically be upward sloping (i.e., "normal"), since contracts for further dates would typically trade at even higher prices. The curves in question plot market prices for various contracts at different maturities (cf. term structure of interest rates). "In broad terms, backwardation reflects the majority market view that spot prices will move down, and contango that they will move up. Both situations allow speculators (non-commercial traders) to earn a profit."

The slope of the curve is not, by itself, a forecast of the future path of spot prices. For a storable commodity, the contemporaneous futures–spot spread can be expressed as

$$F_{t,T}-S_t=\mathrm{Int}_t+w_t-c_t,$$

where $F_{t,T}$ is the futures price at time $t$ for delivery at time $T$, $S_t$ is the spot price, $\mathrm{Int}_t$ is the financing or interest cost, $w_t$ is the storage cost and $c_t$ is the convenience yield. Contango therefore occurs when financing and storage costs exceed the convenience yield. Because the convenience yield varies with inventories and conditions in the physical market, contango may reflect abundant current supply rather than expectations that spot prices will rise.

Contango is normal for a nonperishable commodity that has a cost of carry. Such costs include warehousing fees and interest forgone on money tied up (or the time value of money, etc.), less income from leasing out the commodity if possible (e.g., gold). For perishable commodities, price differences between near and far delivery are not a contango. Different delivery dates are in effect entirely different commodities in this case, since fresh eggs today will not still be fresh in six months' time, ninety-day treasury bills will have matured, etc.

== Description ==
The Commission of the European Communities, in a report on agricultural commodity speculation, defined backwardation and contango in relation to spot prices: "The futures price may be either higher or lower than the spot price. When the spot price is higher than the futures price, the market is said to be in backwardation. It is often called 'normal backwardation' as the futures buyer is rewarded for risk he takes off the producer. If the spot price is lower than the futures price, the market is in contango".

A normal forward curve depicting the prices of multiple contracts, all for the same good, but of different maturities, slopes upward. For example, a forward oil contract for twelve months in the future is selling for $100 today, while today's spot price is $75. The expected spot price twelve months in the future may actually still be $75. To purchase a contract at more than $75 supposes a loss (the "loss" would be $25 if the contract were purchased for $100) to the agent who "bought forward" as opposed to waiting a year to buy at the spot price when oil is actually needed. But even so, there is utility for the forward buyer in the deal.

Experience tells major end users of commodities (such as gasoline refiners, or cereal companies that use great quantities of grain) that spot prices are unpredictable. Locking in a future price puts the purchaser "first in line" for delivery even though the contract will, as it matures, converge on the spot price as shown in the graph. In uncertain markets where end users must constantly have a certain input of a stock of goods, a combination of forward (future) and spot buying reduces uncertainty. An oil refiner might purchase 50% spot and 50% forward, getting an averaged price of $87.50 for the one barrel spot ($75) and the one barrel bought forward ($100).

This strategy can result in unanticipated, or "windfall" profits: If the contract is purchased forward twelve months at $100 and the actual price is $150, the refiner will take delivery of one barrel of oil at $100 and the other at the spot price of $150, or $125 averaged for two barrels: a saving (gain) of $25 per barrel relative to the spot price.

Sellers like to "sell forward" because it locks in an income stream. Farmers are the classic example: by selling their crop forward when it is still in the ground they can lock in a price, and therefore an income, which helps them qualify, in the present, for credit.

The graph of the "life of a single futures contract" (as shown above on the right) will show it converging towards the spot price. The contango contract for future delivery, selling today, is at a price premium relative to buying the commodity today and taking delivery. The backwardation contract selling today is lower than the spot price, and its trajectory will take it upward to the spot price when the contract closes. Paper assets are no different: for example, an insurance company has a constant stream of income from premiums and a constant stream of payments for claims. Income must be invested in new assets and existing assets must be sold to pay off claims. By investing in the purchase and sale of some bonds "forward" in addition to buying spot, an insurance company can smooth out changes in its portfolio and anticipated income.

The Oil Storage contango was introduced to the market in early 1990 by the Swedish-based oil storage company Scandinavian Tank Storage AB and its founder Lars Valentin Jacobsson by using huge military storage installations to bring down the "calculation" cost of storage to create a contango situation out of a "flat" market.

Contango is a potential trap for unwary investors. Exchange-traded funds (ETFs) provide an opportunity for small investors to participate in commodity futures markets, which is tempting in periods of low interest rates. Between 2005 and 2010 the number of futures-based commodity ETFs rose from 2 to 95, and total assets rose from $3.9 billion to nearly $98 billion in the same period. Because the normal course of a futures contract in a market in contango is to decline in price, a fund composed of such contracts buys the contracts at the high price (going forward) and closes them out later at the usually lower spot price. The money raised from the low priced, closed out contracts will not buy the same number of new contracts going forward.

Funds can and have lost money even in fairly stable markets. There are strategies to mitigate this problem, including allowing the ETF to create a stock of precious metals for the purpose of allowing investors to speculate on fluctuations in its value. But storage costs will be quite variable, an example being that copper ingots require considerably more storage space, and thus carrying cost, than gold, and command lower prices in world markets: it is unclear how well a model that works for gold will work with other commodities.

Industrial scale buyers of major commodities, particularly when compared to small retail investors, retain an advantage in futures markets. The raw material cost of the commodity is only one of many factors that influence their final costs and prices. Contango pricing strategies that catch small investors by surprise are more familiar to the managers of a large firm, who must decide whether to take delivery of a product today, at today's spot price, and store it themselves, or pay more for a forward contract, and let someone else do the storage for them.

The contango should not exceed the cost of carry, because producers and consumers can compare the futures contract price against the spot price plus storage, and choose the better one. Arbitrageurs can sell one and buy the other for a theoretically risk-free profit (see rational pricing—futures). The EU describes the two groups of players in the commodity futures market, hedgers (commodity producers and commodity users) or arbitrageurs/speculators (non-commercial investors).

If there is a near-term shortage, the price comparison breaks down and contango may be reduced or perhaps even be reversed altogether into a state called backwardation. In that state, near prices become higher than far (i.e., future) prices because consumers prefer to have the product sooner rather than later (see convenience yield), and because there are few holders who can make an arbitrage profit by selling the spot and buying back the future. A market that has steep backwardation—i.e., one where there is a very steep premium for material available for immediate delivery—often indicates a perception of a current shortage in the underlying commodity. By the same token, a market that is deeply in contango may indicate a perception of a current supply surplus in the commodity.

In 2005 and 2006 a perception of an impending supply shortage allowed traders to take advantages of the contango in the crude oil market. Traders simultaneously bought oil and sold futures forward. This led to large numbers of tankers loaded with oil sitting idle in ports acting as floating warehouses. (see: Oil-storage trade) It was estimated that perhaps a $10–20 per barrel premium was added to spot price of oil as a result of this.

If such was the case, the premium may have ended when global oil storage capacity became exhausted; the contango would have deepened as the lack of storage supply to soak up excess oil supply would have put further pressure on spot prices. However, as crude and gasoline prices continued to rise between 2007 and 2008 this practice became so contentious that in June 2008 the Commodity Futures Trading Commission, the Federal Reserve, and the U.S. Securities and Exchange Commission (SEC) decided to create task forces to investigate whether this took place.

A crude oil contango occurred again in January 2009, with arbitrageurs storing millions of barrels in tankers to profit from the contango (see oil-storage trade). But by the summer, that price curve had flattened considerably. The contango exhibited in crude oil in 2009 explained the discrepancy between the headline spot price increase (bottoming at $35 and topping $80 in the year) and the various tradeable instruments for crude oil (such as rolled contracts or longer-dated futures contracts) showing a much lower price increase. The USO ETF also failed to replicate crude oil's spot price performance.

== Interest rates ==
If short-term interest rates were expected to fall in a contango market, this would narrow the spread between a futures contract and an underlying asset in good supply. This is because the cost of carry will fall due to the lower interest rate, which in turn results in the difference between the price of the future and the underlying growing smaller (i.e. narrowing). An investor would be advised to buy the spread in these circumstances: this is a calendar spread trade where the trader buys the near-dated instrument and simultaneously sells the far-dated instrument (i.e. the future).

If, on the other hand, the spread between a future traded on an underlying asset and the spot price of the underlying asset was set to widen, possibly due to a rise in short-term interest rates, then an investor would be advised to sell the spread (i.e. a calendar spread where the trader sells the near-dated instrument and simultaneously buys the future on the underlying).

== 2007–2008 world food price crisis ==
In a 2010 article in Harper's Magazine, Frederick Kaufman argued the Goldman Sachs Commodity Index caused a demand shock in wheat and a contango market on the Chicago Mercantile Exchange, contributing to the 2007–2008 world food price crisis.

In a June 2010 article in The Economist, the argument is made that index-tracking funds (to which Goldman Sachs Commodity Index was linked) did not cause the bubble. It describes a report by the Organisation for Economic Co-operation and Development that used data from the Commodity Futures Trading Commission to make the case.

== Origin of term ==
The term originated in 19th century England and is believed to be a corruption of "continuation", "continue" or "contingent". In the past on the London Stock Exchange, contango was a fee paid by a buyer to a seller when the buyer wished to defer settlement of the trade they had agreed. The charge was based on the interest forgone by the seller not being paid.

The purpose was normally speculative. Settlement days were on a fixed schedule (such as fortnightly) and a speculative buyer did not have to take delivery and pay for stock until the following settlement day, and on that day could "carry over" their position to the next by paying the contango fee. This practice was common before 1930, but came to be used less and less, particularly after options were reintroduced in 1958.

This fee was similar in character to the present meaning of contango, i.e., future delivery costing more than immediate delivery, and the charge representing cost of carry to the holder.

== Economic theory ==
Economic theory regarding backwardation and contango is associated with John Maynard Keynes and John Hicks.

Keynes in A Treatise on Money assumed there are two types of participants in futures markets: speculators and hedgers. Keynes argued that if hedgers are net short, speculators must be net long. Speculators will not go net long unless the futures price is expected to rise. Keynes called the situation where the futures price is less than the expected spot price at delivery (and hence the futures price is expected to rise) normal backwardation. Industrial hedgers' preference for long rather than short forward positions results in a situation of normal backwardation. Speculators fill the gap by taking profitable short positions, with the risk offset by higher current spot prices.

Hicks "reversed Keynes's theory by pointing out that there are situations where hedgers are net long. In this situation, called contango, speculators must be net short. Speculators will not go net short unless futures prices are expected to fall. When markets are in contango, futures prices are expected to decline." In 1972 Hicks won the Nobel Prize for economics on the basis of Value and Capital, on the economic equilibrium theory, in particular the issue of the stability of equilibrium in an economic system exposed to external shocks.

Bouchouev argued that traditionally there was always more producer hedging than consumer hedging in oil markets. The oil market now attracts investor money which currently far exceeds the gap between producer and consumer. Contango used to be the 'normal' for the oil market. Since c. 2008–9, investors are hedging against "inflation, US dollar weakness and possible geopolitical events," instead of investing in the front end of the oil market. Bouchouev applied the changes in investor behaviour to "the classical Keynes-Hicks theory of normal backwardation, and the Kaldor-Working-Brennan theory of storage, and looked at how calendar spread options (CSOs) became an increasingly popular risk management tool."

== See also ==
- Normal backwardation
- Oil-storage trade
- Theory of storage
- Commodity index fund
