= Settlement date =

Securities industry term

Settlement date is a securities industry term describing the date on which a trade (bonds, equities, foreign exchange, commodities, etc.) settles. That is, the actual day on which transfer of cash or assets is completed and is usually a few days after the trade was done. The number of days between trade date and settlement date depends on the security and the convention in the market it was traded. For example, when settling a share transaction on the London Stock Exchange, this is set at trade date + 2 business days. In the United States, the transfer period was changed from 3 to 2 days in 2017 and to 1 day in 2024.

It is not necessarily the same as value date (when the settlement amount is calculated). For instance, the back office may require a few days to make payment. This gap (between valuation and settlement) is often written into the financial contract, although the actual settlement date can also differ from that originally specified because of problems or errors.

It is occasionally referred to as "contractual settlement date".

== Standard settlement cycles ==
Settlement cycles are commonly expressed using the notation T+n, where T is the trade date and n is the number of business days after the trade date on which settlement occurs. The standard cycle varies by market, asset class, and jurisdiction. In the United States, the standard settlement cycle for most broker-dealer securities transactions was shortened from T+2 to T+1, with a compliance date of 28 May 2024.

Other markets may use different standard settlement periods or may move to shorter cycles at different times. In the United Kingdom, the government has accepted recommendations to make T+1 the standard settlement cycle from 11 October 2027, replacing the current T+2 cycle for relevant securities transactions.

== See also ==
- Trade date
- Spot date
- Value date
- Settlement (finance)
- Herstatt Risk/Settlement risk
- T+2
