= Backwardation =

Situation when futures prices are below the spot price

Backwardation is a market condition where the price of a commodity's forward or futures contract price is trading below the spot price.

The opposite of backwardation is contango, when the futures price is higher than the spot price. Commodities such as money and precious metals are typically in contango, because the seller of futures requires a premium to compensate for the opportunity cost. However, for seasonal commodities or commodities which are difficult to store, such as cattle or lean hogs, occasional backwardation is relatively common.

Consider a commodity such as oil. If a barrel of oil is worth $100 today, a futures contract will often have a higher price, to cover cost of capital and cost of storage. For example, the seller of an oil future might borrow $100, buy a barrel of oil, and store it for a year. Suppose the borrowing cost is 4%/year, and the storage cost is $2/year. Then the seller will require a futures price of $106. Such a market would be said to be in "contango". However, if the price of oil was believed to be temporarily high, due to unexpected short-term supply problems, then the futures price could be lower, even lower than the spot price. If oil prices were expected to fall, the futures price today could be lower than $100. Such a market would be said to be "backwardated", or "in backwardation".

The amount by which a forward price can exceed the spot price (contango) is limited by borrowing and storage costs (cost of carry), assuming storage is possible. If forward prices exceed this, arbitrageurs can make a riskless profit by buying and storing the commodity. However, the forward price may be lower than this positive basis (unless storage is difficult or impossible), and may even be negative (backwardation). There is no riskless process by which a low or negative basis can be restored to the maximum. (Note: Assuming it is not possible to short the underlying. If it were possible to short the physical underlying, then an arbitrageur could borrow and sell the underlying, invest the proceeds, buy the forward, and make a riskless profit.) The difference between the actually observed forward price, and the theoretical forward price implied by the current spot price and the cost of carry, is known as the convenience yield.

In a backwardated market, the forward curve is downward-sloping ("inverted"), because near-dated futures contracts trade above contracts for more distant delivery dates. A forward curve can also be u-shaped or n-shaped.

In agricultural products which are difficult to store, such as cattle or lean hogs, occasional backwardation is relatively common. Seasonal agricultural products can be backwardated if they do not store well. Supply shocks also cause backwardation, when prices are anticipated to fall in the future.

Backwardation seldom arises in money commodities like gold or silver. In late 1979 and early 1980, there was backwardation in silver due to attempt by the Hunt family to corner the silver market (see Silver Thursday). In December 2008, gold prices were in backwardation for at least a week, due to very low overnight funding rates.

== Examples ==
Notable examples of backwardation include:

- Copper circa 1990, apparently arising from market manipulation by Yasuo Hamanaka of Sumitomo Corporation in what has come to be called the "Sumitomo copper affair".
- In 2013, the wholesale commercial gas market entered backwardation during the month of March. The 2-year contract prices fell below the price of 1-year contracts.
- During the 2026 Iran war, oil futures were backwardated as a result of disruption to oil supplies.

== Origin of the term ==
The term originated in late-18th/early-19th century England, originating from "backward". It predates contango, which originated in the mid-19th century. It originally meant a fee paid by the seller of stock to delay delivery to a future date.

The purpose was speculative, allowing short selling. Settlement days were on a fixed schedule (such as fortnightly) and a short seller did not have to deliver stock until the following settlement day, and on that day could "carry over" their position to the next by paying a backwardation fee. This practice was common before 1930, but came to be used less and less, particularly since options were reintroduced in 1958.

The fee here did not indicate a near-term shortage of stock the way backwardation means today. It was more like a "lease rate", the cost of borrowing a stock or commodity for a period of time.

The term began to be used in its new sense around the 1930s, for example in Keynes' "Treatise on Money", however in this case still applied to stocks. It gradually began to be used more to refer to commodities markets, such as tin.

== Normal backwardation ==
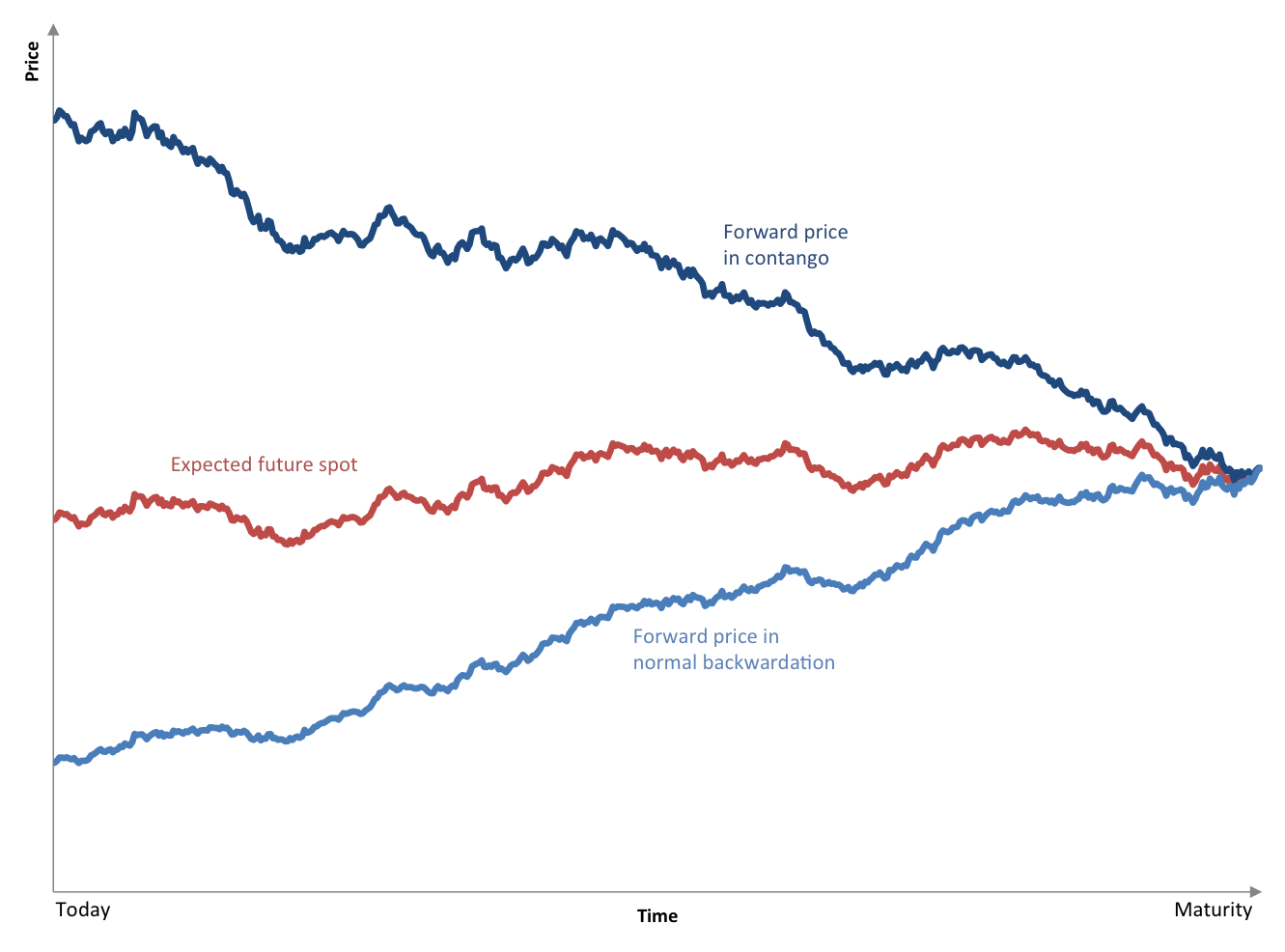
The graph depicts how the price of a single forward contract will behave through time in relation to the expected future price. A contract in backwardation will increase in value until it equals the spot price of the underlying at maturity. Note that this graph does not show the forward curve (which plots against maturities on the horizontal).

"Normal backwardation" refers to economists John Maynard Keynes' and John Hicks' theory that futures prices have a downward bias.

In A Treatise on Money (1930), Keynes argued that producers (sellers) of commodities are more prone to hedge their price risk than consumers (buyers). He argued that the buyer of a futures contract would be more likely to be a speculator, who would demand a discount to the expected future spot price, in order to make an expected return. This theory has some empirical support.

Keynes compared futures prices not to the current spot price, but to the expected spot price in the future. Consider a commodity whose price is not expected to change. In such a case, a speculator will not pay a premium for a future, because they do not expect to be able to sell the underlying at a higher price on the maturity date. Rather, they will require a discount in order to make an expected profit, and to account for the risk that the price falls.

John Hicks, in Value and Capital (1939), also argued that the risk premium would typically accrue to the buyer of futures.

== See also ==
- Yield curve
