= Trade date =

Finance stubs

Trade date is the date on which a security trade occurs. A trade done very early or very late falls on the previous or following trade date.

This occurs because in the international market a trade conducted in (e.g.) Japanese equities at 3 pm in London needs to effectively be considered as the following day for Japanese stock exchange reporting requirements.

In London and the US, the settlement period from trade date is 2 days.

== See also ==
- Settlement date
- Spot date
- Value date
