= Convenience yield =

Implied return on holding inventories

A convenience yield is an implied return on holding inventories. It is the difference between the theoretically implied non-arbitrage forward price based on the current spot price and the cost of carry, and the actually observed forward price which is usually lower.

Let $F_{t,T}$ be the forward price of an asset with initial price $S_t$ and maturity $T$. Suppose that $r$ is the continuously compounded interest rate for one year. Then, the non-arbitrage pricing formula should be

$F_{t,T} = S_t \cdot e^{r(T-t)}$

If the forward price exceeded this amount, arbitrageurs would buy the commodity, store it, and deliver it in the future to fulfil the forward contract, thus making a riskless profit.

However, in most commodity markets, the forward price is lower than this implied price, partly because of the inability of investors and speculators to short the underlying asset. Instead, there is a correction to the forward pricing formula given by the convenience yield $c$. Hence

$F_{t,T} = S_t \cdot e^{(r-c)(T-t)}$

== Example ==
A trader has observed that the price of six-month ($T$) gold futures price (F) is $1,300 per troy ounce, whereas the spot price (S) is $1,371 per troy ounce. The (not compounded) borrowing rate for a six-month loan ($r$) is 3.5% per annum, and storage cost for gold is negligible (0%). Since we know we have the relation:

$F = S \left[ 1 + (r - c) T \right]$

What is the convenience yield implied by the futures price?

From the formula above, we isolate the convenience yield ($c$), and we obtain:

$c = r + \frac{1}{T} \left(1 - \frac{F}{S} \right)$

$c = 0.035 + \frac{1}{0.5} \left(1 - \frac{1300}{1371} \right)= 0.13857 = 13.9\%$ (per annum, not compounded)

For information, if we had a continuously compounded 6-month borrowing rate and if we were looking for the continuously compounded convenience yield, we would have the formula:

$F = S \cdot e^{ (r-c) T }$

And the convenience yield would therefore be:

$c = r - \frac{1}{T} \ln\left( \frac{F}{S} \right)$

$c = 0.035 - \frac{1}{0.5} \times \ln\left( \frac{1300}{1371} \right) = 0.14135 = 14.1\%$ (per annum, continuously compounded)

== Why should a convenience yield exist? ==
Users of a consumption asset may obtain a benefit from physically holding the asset (as inventory) prior to T (maturity) which is not obtained from holding the futures contract. These benefits include the ability to profit from temporary shortages, and the ability to keep a production process running.

One of the main reasons that it appears is due to availability of stocks and inventories of the commodity in question. Everyone who owns inventory has the choice between consumption today and investment for the future. A rational investor will choose the outcome that is best for himself.

When inventories are high, this suggests an expected relatively low scarcity of the commodity today versus some time in the future. Otherwise, the investor would not perceive that there is any benefit of holding onto inventory and therefore sell his stocks. Hence, expected future prices should be higher than they currently are. Futures or forward prices $F_{t,T}$ of the asset should then be higher than the current spot price, $S_t$. From the above formula, this only tells us that $r-c >0$.

The interesting line of reasoning comes when inventories are low. When inventories are low, we expect that scarcity now is greater than in the future. Unlike the previous case, the investor can not buy inventory to make up for demand today. In a sense, the investor wants to borrow inventory from the future but is unable. Therefore, we expect future prices to be lower than today and hence that $F_{t,T} < S_t$. This implies that $r-c < 0$.

Consequently, the convenience yield is inversely related to inventory levels.

== See also ==
- Backwardation
