= Currency strength index =

Value of currency

Currency strength index expresses the index value of currency. For economists, it is often calculated as purchasing power, while for financial traders, it can be described as an indicator, reflecting many factors related to the currency; for example, fundamental data, overall economic performance or interest rates. It can also be calculated from the currency in relation to other currencies, usually using a pre-defined currency basket. A typical example of this method is the U.S. Dollar Index. The current trend in currency strength indicators is to combine more currency indexes in order to make forex movements easily visible. For the calculation of indexes of this kind, major currencies are usually used because they represent up to 90% of the whole forex market volume.

== Currency strength based trading indicators ==
Currency strength is calculated from the U.S. Dollar Index, which is used as a reference for other currency indexes.

Percentage currency strength index on the analytic platform.

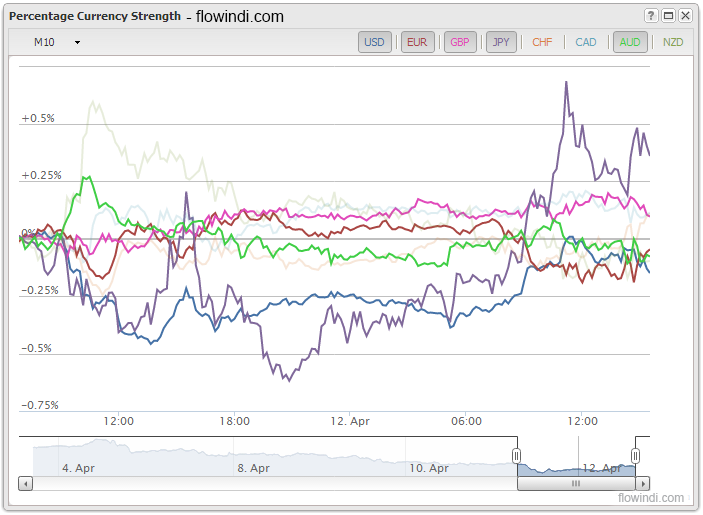
Print screen from analytic platform.

The basic idea behind indicators is "to buy strong currency and to sell weak currency".
It is X/Y currency pair is an uptrend, you are able to determine whether this happens due to X's strength or Y's weakness.

Currency strength indicators enable to choose the most valuable pair to trade; see the reactions of each currency on moves in correlated instruments (for example CAD/OIL or AUD/GOLD); look for a strong trend in one currency, and include multiple currencies into a chart.

A good indicator of the money flow of the market should be the sum of all the graphs, by groups (example: forex, raw materials, companies ... and the sum of altogether) to know if the market is growing or decreasing.

=== Examples ===
Typical examples of indicators based on currency strength are relative currency strength and percentage currency strength. Their combination is called the "Forex Flow indicator" because one is able to see the whole currency flow across the forex market.

== See also ==
- Balance of trade
- Technical analysis
- Hard currency
- Market analysis
