= Food inflation in Iran =

Rise of food prices in Iran

Iran has faced severe food inflation in the past decade, driven by multiple factors. These include agricultural, climatic and energy challenges, significant issues in water management, and inefficiencies in the food supply chain. A major contributing factor is the involvement of the Iranian Revolutionary Guard Corps (IRGC) in the economy, particularly in the agriculture and food sectors but also due to significant spendings on Iran's proxies which increase the public deficit. The IRGC’s influence has been linked to mismanagement and corruption, exacerbating problems in water resources, agricultural practices, and food production.

== Poor usage of Iran's agricultural land ==
Approximately one-third of Iran's total surface area consists of arable farmland; however, less than one-fourth of this—equivalent to about one-tenth of the total land area—is actively cultivated. This limited cultivation is due to poor soil quality and inadequate water distribution across many regions. Of the cultivated land, less than one-third benefits from irrigation, while most rely on dry farming techniques. The most fertile soils are found in the western and northwestern regions of the country.

== The increase in food prices ==
Since 2014, Iran has faced a persistent decline in food production, coupled with significant increases in food prices. For instance, the price of rice has surged by 2.11 times between 2012 and 2023, while bread costs have risen 3.4 times from 2011 to 2023. Potatoes have tripled in price over the same period, and chicken fillets have seen a 2.06-fold increase from 2010 to 2023. Despite these inflationary trends, the median net salary in Iran has only grown by 33% between 2020 and 2023, between 2022-2023 alone the Iranian rial lost half of its value, inflation surpassed 50% and the minimum wage rose only by 27%. This discrepancy underscores the nation’s food crisis, with recent data revealing that in a period of several weeks in 2024, bread prices rose by 66% and milk prices rose by 25%. These trends indicate ongoing food shortages and exacerbate food insecurity in Iran, where approximately one-quarter of the population resides in slums, facing moderate to severe food insecurity. Between January 2025 and January 2026, the price of food has nearly doubled.

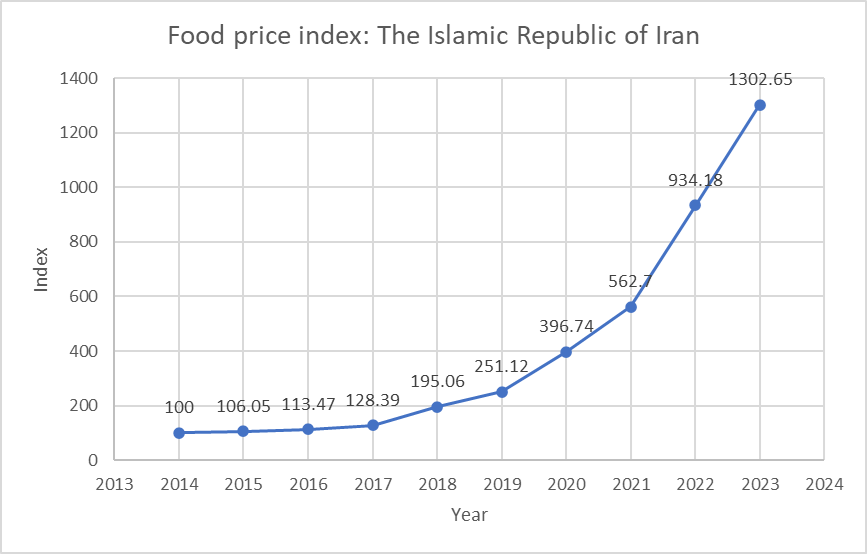
Food price index: The Islamic Republic of Iran

As a result the number of people that cannot afford a healthy diet increased substantially:

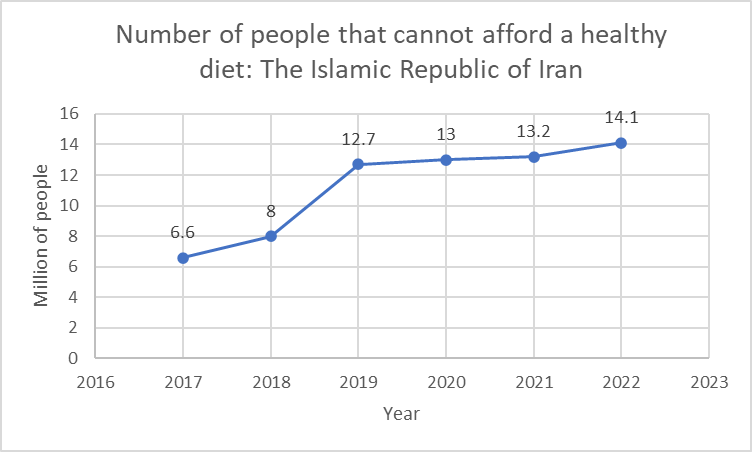
Number of people that cannot afford a healthy diet: The Islamic Republic of Iran

== Food inflation causes ==
=== International sanctions ===
In response to Iran's nuclear and ballistic missile advancements, as well as its backing of militant organizations that compromise regional peace, the United States, in conjunction with a network of international allies, has imposed a rigorous sanctions regime. This multifaceted approach extends beyond Iran’s military activities, with its record of human rights abuse further justifying the global punitive measures. The sanctions have specifically targeted Iran's crucial oil sector and banking systems, which are central to its economy. As a result, these measures have significantly undermined the nation's ability to earn foreign currency, dealing a critical blow to its economic infrastructure and foreign trade relationships. This limitation has considerably impeded Iran's capacity to import essential food products and agricultural inputs, including seeds, fertilizers, and machinery. Consequently, the sanctions have led to increased production costs and higher food prices. Furthermore, the disruption of critical supply chains has increased transportation expenses, intensifying inflationary pressures within the country.

=== Exchange rate volatility ===
Due to international sanctions and ineffective economic management, the Iranian rial depreciated significantly by approximately 37% between October 2014 and October 2024. This depreciation rendered imports more expensive, directly affecting the prices of food products, particularly those reliant on imported goods. Moreover, the government's efforts to manage multiple exchange rates have introduced market distortions and inefficiencies, further exacerbating price volatility.

=== Agricultural challenges ===
Iran is grappling with severe water scarcity and desertification that adversely impact its agricultural output. Over the past century, Iran's population surged from ten to over eighty-five million, and its renewable water resources declined from 130 BCM (Billion Cubic Meters) to 80-85 BCM. Projections suggest that by 2041, water resources could be halved, posing significant challenges as the population is expected to exceed 100 million. Per capita water availability is anticipated to fall below 500 cubic meters, marking absolute scarcity. Extended periods of drought and inefficient water resources management, in addition to outdated infrastructure and agricultural practices continue to limit productivity, further contribute to rising prices.

=== Global factors ===
Global factors, including climate change, armed conflicts (e.g., the war in Ukraine), and international market fluctuations, affect food prices worldwide. As Iran is a significant importer of food and agricultural inputs, these global trends directly affect its domestic pricing. In particular, increases in the prices of key commodities such as wheat, corn, and vegetable oils contribute to Iran's food inflation.

=== Subsidy reforms and economic policies ===
The Iranian government has, at times, cut subsidies on essential goods or tried to reform the subsidy system to address budget deficits. These changes often lead to sudden price hikes in food items. The subsidies have been replaced with in-kind transfers.

For several decades, the Iranian government has regulated the prices of over 20 essential goods. These prices, known as administered prices, are determined by the Consumer and Producer Protection Organization (CPPO) in collaboration with the Iranian Parliament. The CPPO sets consumer prices below both reference (border) prices and producer prices, with the government budget absorbing the resulting financial gap.

In 2007, food subsidies represented approximately 2.8 percent of Iran's GDP. These subsidies are primarily directed toward cereals, which account for 50 percent of the total, while other basic food items such as sugar, cooking oils, and baby formulas comprise an additional 25 percent. The remaining 25 percent is allocated to various goods, including paper, agricultural machinery, fertilizers, and pharmaceuticals.

As part of the Targeted Subsidies Reform, the government raised bread prices by as much as 25 percent in December 2010. After this adjustment, the CPPO prohibited any further price increases and instituted regular market inspections to prevent public unrest that could arise from inflationary pressures.

The subsidy cuts continue, despite the public unrest they cause to Iranian citizens who are grappling with rising poverty and rampant inflation, to reduce budget deficits.

=== Smuggling and black-market activity ===
Smuggling of subsidized goods, such as wheat and other food staples, is common in Iran due to price discrepancies between Iran and its neighboring countries. Traders profit from exporting these goods illegally, reducing domestic availability and inflating prices. This problem is compounded by insufficient enforcement and border control, allowing such activities to thrive.

=== Hoarding by intermediaries ===
Intermediaries, who play a significant role in Iran's distribution network, often hoard food products when they anticipate price increases. By controlling the release of these goods, they can manipulate market conditions to maximize profits. This practice not only increases prices but also leads to significant volatility in the market.

=== Lack of infrastructure and transparency ===
The absence of modern infrastructure and transparent regulatory oversight allows corrupt practices to flourish. Inefficient transportation and storage systems result in spoilage and loss, reducing the effective supply of food. Additionally, the government's lack of proper market monitoring mechanisms enables these inefficiencies and manipulations to persist unchecked.

=== Inefficiency and corruption ===
Inefficiencies and corruption in distribution systems can lead to artificial shortages and price manipulation, contributing to inflation. This situation is rooted in several systemic issues:

==== Corruption and monopolies ====
Corruption within Iran's food supply chain represents a significant structural challenge, where politically connected businesses and individuals exploit their influence to monopolize distribution channels. These actors secure preferential access to subsidized food commodities, a privilege often derived from their ties to political elites. By hoarding these essential products, they deliberately engineer artificial shortages, only to later release the goods into the black market at significantly higher prices. This form of market manipulation not only distorts supply dynamics but also exacerbates inflationary pressures, undermining both economic stability and equitable access to essential goods.

==== Government policy failures and subsidy mismanagement ====
The Iranian government's control of prices through subsidies and other measures frequently backfires. For example, subsidies meant to make essential items affordable are sometimes misappropriated by corrupt officials and traders who sell these goods outside official channels at inflated rates. This diversion exacerbates shortages in the official markets and pushes up prices.

==== IRGC and corruption in water management ====
Rapid urbanization and agricultural demands have exacerbated the country's already scarce water supply. With approximately 90% of Iran's water resources allocated to agriculture, the inefficiency of irrigation practices and the overreliance on groundwater are leading to severe depletion of these vital reserves. The role of climate change, which is intensifying droughts and reducing available surface water, further stresses the system. Iran's water management strategies, including the construction of dams and water transfer projects, have been politically driven and often disregard environmental and social impacts. These policies contribute to ecological damage, including the drying up of rivers and wetlands, such as Lake Urmia, which has shrunk by over 80% due to diversion projects and the construction of dams without proper environmental assessments. Such ecological damage affects biodiversity and threatens agricultural productivity, as salinization renders once-fertile land unusable, and further intensifies dust storms and land subsidence in regions like Khuzestan and Sistan-Baluchestan. Such environmental degradation, combined with insufficient governmental oversight and transparency, worsens living conditions for marginalized communities, reinforcing cycles of poverty and socio-political marginalization. These policies fail to address the root causes of scarcity and disproportionately affect rural and peripheral communities, leading to civil disorder.

Corruption in Iran's water supply sector has deep roots and manifests through misallocation of resources, illegal water extraction, lack of transparency, and neglect of marginalized communities. Iran's water management system has been plagued by political favoritism. The IRGC and other politically connected entities control water resources, prioritizing projects for political and economic gain rather than public need. They divert supplies to favored regions, causing shortages in vulnerable provinces like Khuzestan and Sistan-Baluchestan. For example, water diversion projects in Isfahan and Yazd provinces received priority despite critical shortages in Khuzestan and Sistan-Baluchestan. Reports also indicate that certain agricultural and industrial enterprises with ties to the Iranian Revolutionary Guard Corps (IRGC) have received significant amounts of water, while small farmers and rural communities struggle with severe shortages. In addition, rural and minority populations face ecological degradation and a loss of livelihoods. This pattern of unequal development not only exacerbates regional disparities but also fuels social unrest. Iran's water policy is also characterized by an overreliance on dam construction and large-scale diversion projects, primarily benefiting politically connected enterprises and urban elites.

The IRGC, through its construction arm Khatam al-Anbiya, monopolizes Iran's water management. This "water mafia" controls major infrastructure projects like dam construction, prioritizing financial and political gains over environmental and social considerations. The IRGC's dominance undermines sustainable water policies, contributing to Iran's ongoing water crisis and highlighting the complex interplay between power, corruption, and resource management.

==== Illegal water extraction ====
Illegal water extraction in Iran is a significant issue, contributing to the country's water scarcity. Many influential figures, including local officials and powerful business interests, operate unauthorized wells and exploit groundwater reserves beyond legal limits. Despite regulations to control water use, enforcement is weak, leading to the depletion of critical aquifers, land subsidence, and desertification, especially in agricultural regions like Fars and Khorasan. The problem is compounded by corruption, as those with political connections often evade penalties, further undermining sustainable water management efforts. According to Mohammad Hajrasouliha, the managing director of Iran Water Resources Management Company, there are almost 320,000 illegal wells, and between 13,000 and 14,000 illegal wells are sealed yearly. The fees for water are another factor causing misuse of water.

==== Lack of transparency in project management ====
Transparency issues arise from the allocation of contracts for water infrastructure projects. Iran's opaque procurement process often involves awarding contracts to companies associated with political elites without open and fair competition. This leads to inflated project costs and results in poor quality and environmentally damaging outcomes. A notable example is the Gotvand Dam project. Despite warnings from environmental experts about the dam's construction on salt beds, which would increase the salinity of the Karun River, the project proceeded due to political pressure and vested interests. The dam's construction led to severe ecological damage and increased salinity levels, rendering the water unusable for agriculture and consumption downstream.

==== Water shortage and social unrest ====
Protests related to water shortages have become increasingly common in Iran. In July 2021, demonstrations erupted in Khuzestan when citizens accused the government of diverting water resources to support industries and other regions, leaving local communities without sufficient drinking water or irrigation supplies. Similar unrest has occurred in Sistan-Baluchestan, where residents face chronic water shortages exacerbated by mismanagement and illegal water extraction.

=== Food chain supply problems and the IRGC ===
The food supply chain consists of five main stages: production, handling and storage, processing and packaging, distribution and retail, and finally, consumption. It differs significantly from a regular supply chain due to the perishability of products, strict safety regulations, and the need for precise temperature control, especially in cold chain logistics. Key challenges include managing condition deviations such as temperature or humidity fluctuations, which can cause spoilage; preventing package damage during transportation; and ensuring compliance with food safety standards. High maintenance costs are also a concern, particularly for perishable and cold chain items, as they require specialized equipment and monitoring. Furthermore, the flow of information across the supply chain is critical, as delays or inaccuracies can lead to inefficiencies and disruptions. The food supply chain demands efficient management, integrated data systems, and adherence to global safety regulations to maintain product quality and minimize losses.

In addition to water management, the Islamic Revolutionary Guard Corps (IRGC) plays a significant role in Iran's economy. The IRGC has strategically diversified its operations beyond military and defense industries into critical sectors such as agriculture, construction, telecommunications, and energy. This expansion aligns with Iran's "resistance economy" policy to achieve self-reliance and mitigate the impacts of international sanctions. The IRGC's economic influence includes dominance over agricultural development and food production projects. Through its construction and engineering arm, Khatam al-Anbiya (GHORB), the IRGC manages and develops large-scale agricultural and irrigation projects, giving it control over crucial aspects of food production. This involvement ensures that the IRGC can manipulate Iran's food supply chain and monopolize critical segments of the food industry, from farm outputs to food processing facilities, thus limiting competition. The IRGC uses its dominant position in Iran's food industry as both an economic and political tool. The organization benefits from favorable government contracts and subsidies, further entrenching its presence. By controlling the distribution of essential commodities like wheat, livestock, and other food products, the IRGC gains leverage over the population and local markets. This allows it to suppress dissent and maintain loyalty by manipulating access to essential resources, this being part of a broader trend of militarization of Iran's economy. The IRGC uses its influence to manage critical supply chains, including food, which allows it to stabilize and control internal markets, particularly in times of crisis or under sanctions. This move not only supports their logistical needs but also strengthens the IRGC's economic and political leverage within the country. The IRGC's practices contribute to the informal economy, where food and agricultural products are smuggled or withheld to manipulate prices. For example, the IRGC's involvement in border controls and critical transportation hubs, such as airports, allows it to bypass customs regulations, importing goods illicitly to maintain its economic advantage. This behavior often destabilizes local markets and contributes to food insecurity, as the organization's financial interests may not align with public needs.

These activities highlight the IRGC's transition from a military and security body to a comprehensive socio-economic entity within Iran, wielding significant power over critical resources, including the food supply chain.

== Proposed solutions ==
Tackling food inflation in Iran requires a deep, multifaceted approach due to the complex nature of the underlying causes.

=== Improving agricultural productivity ===
Iran's agricultural sector has faced declining productivity due to water shortages, outdated irrigation systems, and inefficient farming practices. Improving agricultural productivity is key to stabilizing food prices, and several steps can be taken.

Modernizing Irrigation Techniques: Iran relies heavily on water-intensive crops like rice and wheat. The country also has one of the highest water withdrawal rates in the world. Transitioning to modern irrigation systems such as drip or precision farming can reduce water usage while increasing crop yields. Adopting New Agricultural Technologies: Investing in agricultural technology, including mechanization, better seeds (e.g., drought-resistant varieties), and soil fertility management, could significantly boost production efficiency. Government Support for Farmers: Providing education, subsidies, and financial assistance to small farmers can help them transition to more sustainable practices. Support programs targeting efficient use of resources would increase resilience against price shocks and reduce reliance on imports.

=== Reforming subsidy systems and price controls ===
Iran’s current subsidy system is heavily focused on energy and basic goods, often leading to market inefficiencies and resource mismanagement. Transitioning from universal subsidies (which encourage overuse) to targeted subsidies for low-income families can improve efficiency. This allows the government to allocate resources better and reduce inflationary pressures. While price controls aim to protect consumers, they can lead to shortages when prices are set below market levels. Iran could better balance supply and demand by gradually moving towards a system that allows prices to reflect market realities while protecting vulnerable populations with direct financial assistance. Enforcing regulations to curb hoarding, monopolistic practices, and price gouging, particularly by powerful entities like the IRGC, is crucial for maintaining fair prices.

=== Fighting Corruption and Improving Governance ===
Corruption and a lack of transparency are significant barriers to economic stability in Iran. The IRGC’s involvement in various economic sectors, including food distribution, distorts the market and contributes to inflation. The government could reduce the economic role of entities like the IRGC by imposing regulations or transferring state contracts to private firms through transparent bidding processes. This would foster competition and reduce monopolistic practices.

=== Water and Land Management Reforms ===
Iran’s over-extraction of groundwater and inefficient use of surface water must be addressed. Policies such as water pricing reforms, investment in water-saving technologies, and promoting water recycling could help conserve resources and support agriculture. Combatting soil erosion and desertification through sustainable agricultural practices, such as crop rotation, agroforestry, and organic farming, can enhance food security (Amiraslani & Dragovich, 2011; Emadodin et al., 2012).

== Current food inflation ==
On 16 February 2025, Mohsen Baghaei, a workers' representative on the Supreme Labor Council, warned of steep price hikes in essential goods over the past two months, with cooking oil up 40%, rice nearly doubling, and staples like potatoes and onions also surging. He estimated that the average worker’s cost-of-living basket has risen over 30% in this period, jumping from 300 million rials ($325) to 380 million rials ($413).

According to Iran international as of February 2025 the price of one kg of kiwi equals 2% of the average income.

On 23 February 2025, a government agency announced an annual rate of 35%. However, labor groups and analysts argue that the government minimizes negative economic news, implying that the actual inflation rate is considerably higher. The Iranian rial has depreciated by more than 50% over the past six months, fueling expectations of even higher inflation. Currently, the minimum wage is approximately $120 per month, while semi-official estimates suggest that a family of three requires at least $400 per month to meet its basic needs.

With Nowruz 2025 approaching, food prices are surging. Approximately one-third of essential food items have experienced price hikes between 30% and 50%, with some items increasing by over 50%. Meanwhile, wages remain low, as the minimum monthly wage for a worker with two children is just $120.

In 1403 (Iranian calendar) food prices rose by 70%, packaging costs rose in some cases by 200%, and freight charges climbed 55%.

The secondary tariffs which U.S. president Donald J. Trump threatens to impose on Iran further aggravates inflation as the oil revenues are expected to decrease and cause a further depreciation of the Iranian real.

According to the world bank food security report food prices increased from April 2024 to April 2025 by 42.3% making the food inflation in the Iran the second largest in the world.

== Food production indices ==
According to the Food and Agriculture Organization of the United Nations Iran suffers a major decline in the food production per capita:

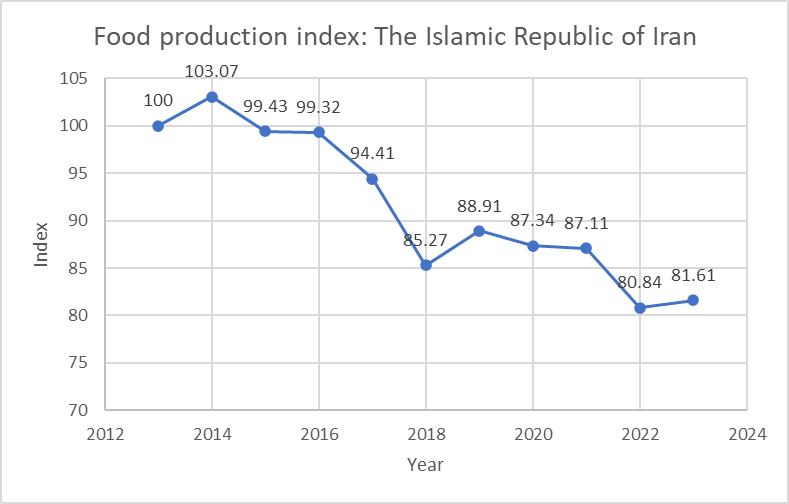
Food production index: The Islamic Republic of Iran

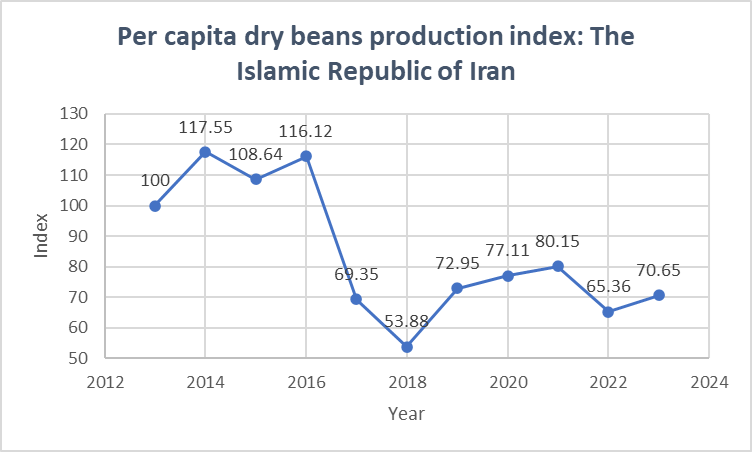
Per capita dry beans production index: The Islamic Republic of Iran

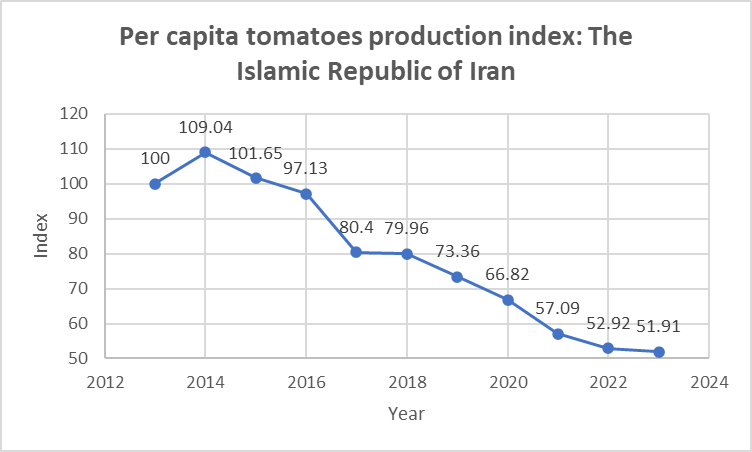
Per capita tomatoes production index: The Islamic Republic of Iran

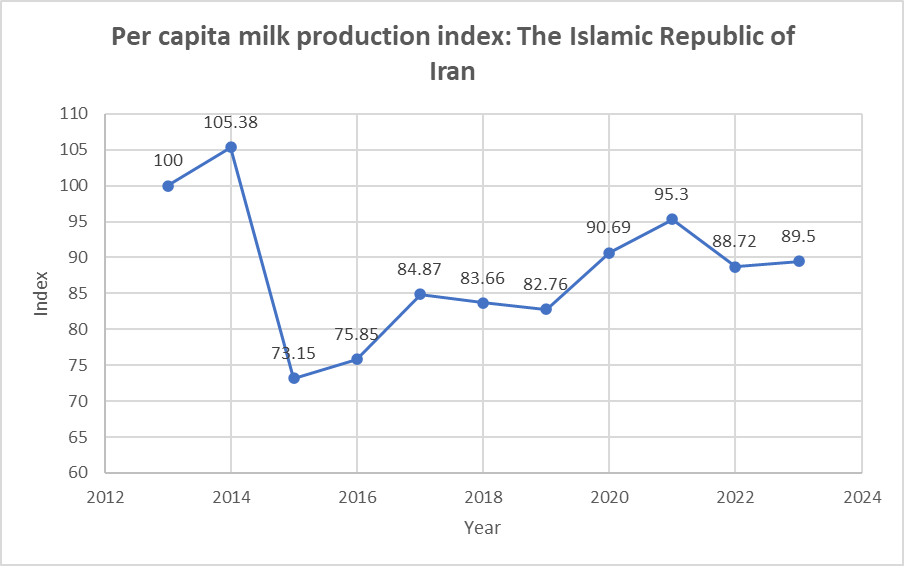
Per capita milk production index: The Islamic Republic of Iran

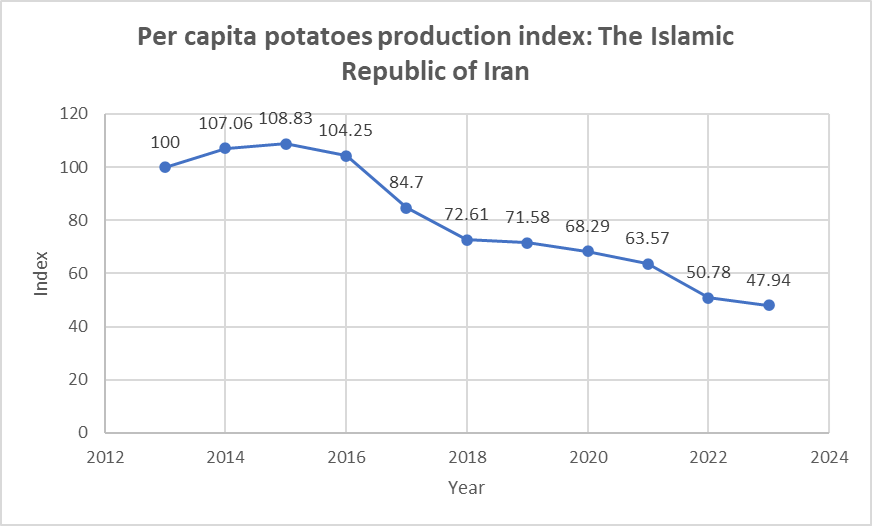
Per capita potatoes production index: The Islamic Republic of Iran

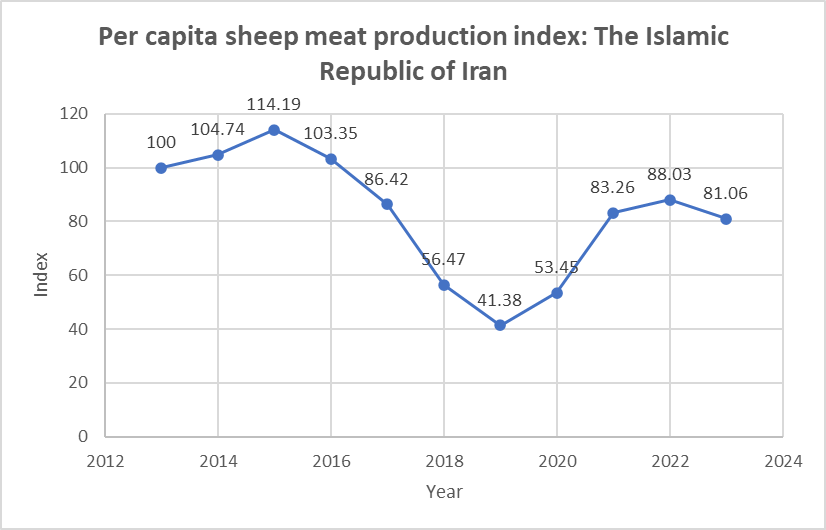
Per capita sheep meat production index: The Islamic Republic of Iran

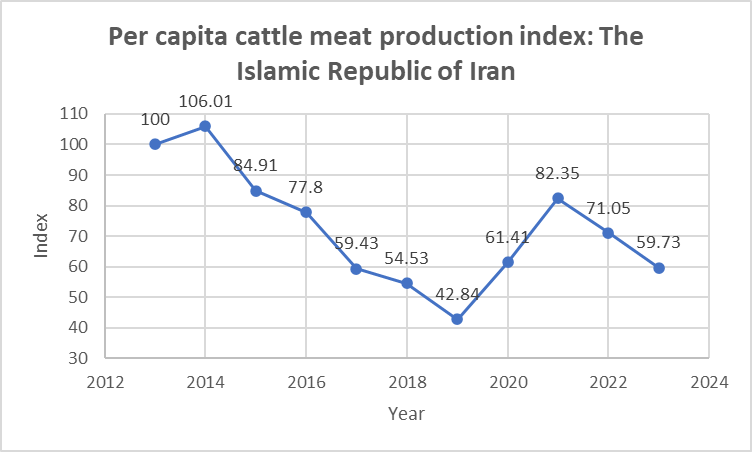
Per capita cattle meat production index: The Islamic Republic of Iran

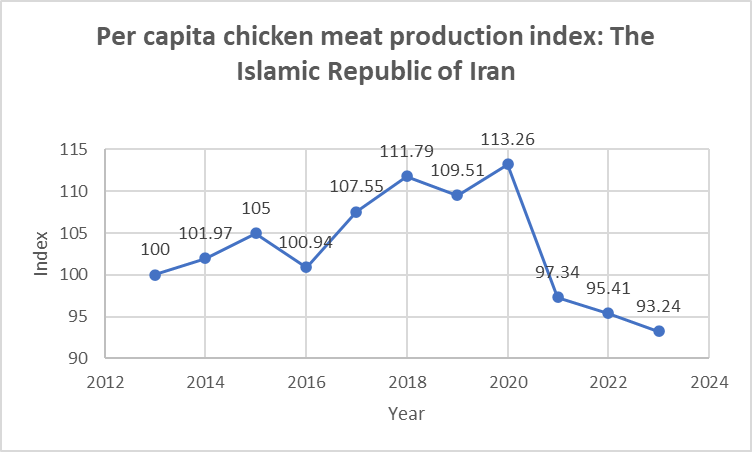
Per capita chicken meat production index: The Islamic Republic of Iran

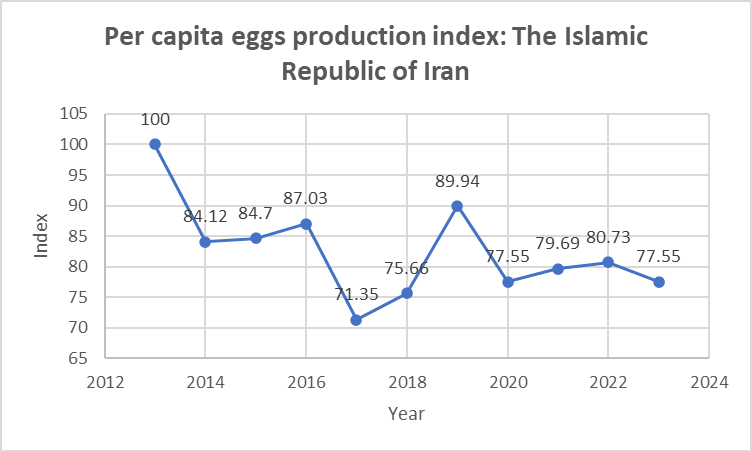
Per capita eggs production index: The Islamic Republic of Iran

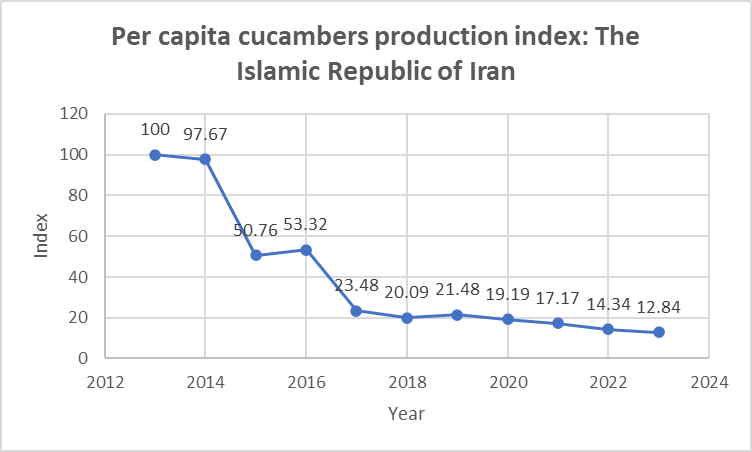
Per capita cucambers production index: The Islamic Republic of Iran

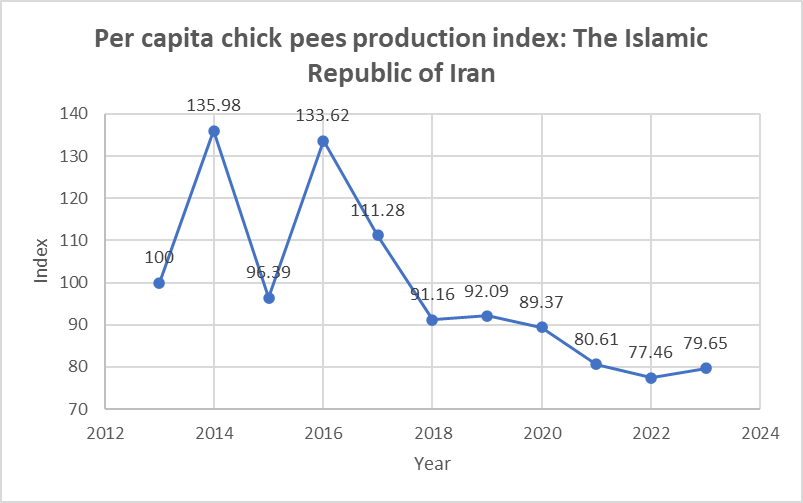
Per capita chick pees production index: The Islamic Republic of Iran

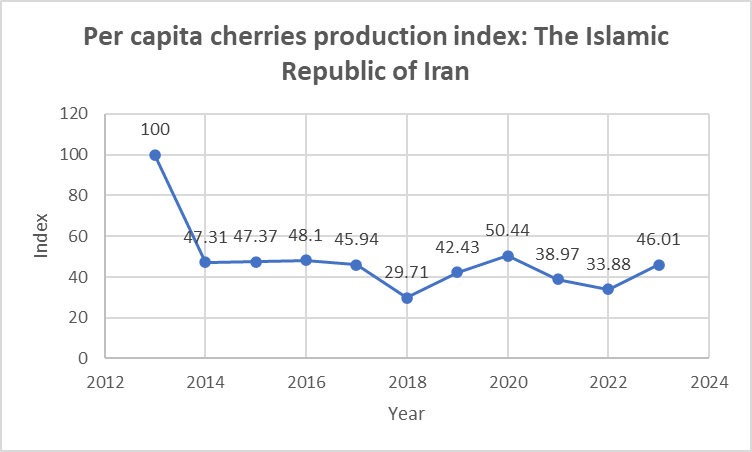
Per capita cherries production index: The Islamic Republic of Iran

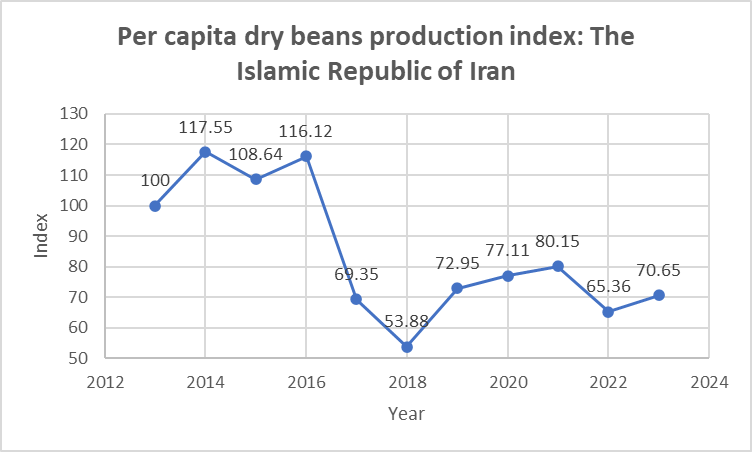
Per capita dry beans production index: The Islamic Republic of Iran

== See also ==
- Salaries in Iran
- Economy of Iran
- Water scarcity in Iran
- Nowruz
- Agriculture in Iran
- 2025 Iranian Bakers' Protests
