= Base currency =

Base currency may refer to:

- the first currency quoted in a currency pair
- a functional currency
