= Fxmarketspace =

UK foreign exchange company, 2006–2008

FXMarketSpace
- Type: Private
- Founded: May 4, 2006
- Defunct: October 10, 2008
- Fate: Dissolved
- Headquarters: London, England
- Key people: Mark Robson, CEO; Rick Sears, President
- Parent: Reuters 50%; Chicago Mercantile Exchange 50%
- Website: www.fxmarketspace.com

FXMarketSpace (FXMS) was a centrally cleared, global foreign exchange (FX) platform for the over the counter (OTC) cash market. It was launched in May 2006 as a joint venture between Reuters and the Chicago Mercantile Exchange, but they decided to close the platform in October 2008 as it had not attracted enough liquidity.

== History ==
FXMS was formed through a 50/50 joint venture between Reuters and the Chicago Mercantile Exchange (CME) to serve the needs of the FX market, including speed, efficiency, centralised clearing and complete anonymity.

On 4 May 2006, the two parent companies announced the joint venture of FXMS and gained Financial Services Authority approval. The executive director, Bryan Hunter also resigned on the same day.

On 26 March 2007, FXMarketSpace was declared "fully operational and open for trading".

On 31 March 2008, FXMarketSpace announced FXSettle, a settlement solution that intelligently routes trades directly to the bank or settlement agent - guaranteeing against settlement and replacement risk, and reducing costs.

On 11 September 2008, Euromoney's Weekly FiX column reported that the CME decided to no longer financially support the platform. FXMS declined to comment.

== Settlement ==
On September 18, 2008, FXMarketSpace announced that it had successfully settled $35 billion using the FXSettle service. The announcement stated: "The recent volatile financial markets, in which some counterparties were unable to settle their trades, have highlighted the importance of credit risk management. FXMarketSpace is the only trading platform where both replacement risk and settlement risk are eliminated."

On 10 October 2008, CME and Thomson Reuters announced their decision to close FXMarketSpace.

== See also ==
- ChangeGroup
- Beta 2 Limited
