= Beta 2 =

Beta 2 (β2), may stand for:

- Beta-2 adrenergic receptor
- Beta 2 Limited
- NeuroD1, transcription factor
- TGF beta 2
