= Second-Tier Foreign Exchange Market =

Nigerian foreign exchange market

Second-Tier Foreign Exchange Market sometimes known by the acronym SFEM was a second official foreign exchange market in Nigeria that opened in September 1986 and was effective until middle of 1987. The market window was open to both Nigerians and foreigners and the initial plan was to find a market rate for the naira. A first tier market was operated by the government for debt servicing and servicing public sector letters of credit The SFEM was the first time a Nigerian government floated a dual exchange rate system.

== Flexible rate system ==
Prior to SFEM, the government through the Central Bank fixed the exchange rate which was 99 cents to a naira in May 1986. This mechanism was backed by import restriction, a pegged currency and foreign exchange control. However, when new stiffer import restrictions and foreign exchange controls were implemented in 1982 it created a divergence between the government official rates and the rates obtained in the parallel market sometimes called the black market. In 1986 this rate was up to 4 naira to $1 naira. The introduction of SFEM was to dampen interest in the black market, deregulate the financial sector and allow market forces to determine the exchange rate. SFEM began in September 26, 1986 with the value of the naira determined by weekly auction and the highest bids receive not more than 10% of the allocation. From its beginning, the system led to a devaluation of the naira with rates determined by the average of successful bids, marginal pricing and finally through dutch auction. In April 1987 the exchange rates became determined by a dutch auction system until the second exchange rate was merged with the official exchange rate in July 1987 to form the Foreign Exchange Market which operated under the auction system of SFEM.
