= Currency strength =

Foreign exchange trading indicator

Currency strength expresses the value of currency. For economists, it is often calculated as purchasing power, while for financial traders, it can be described as an indicator, reflecting many factors related to the currency; for example, fundamental data, overall economic performance (stability) or interest rates. It can also be calculated from currency in relation to other currencies, usually using a pre-defined currency basket. A typical example of this method is the U.S. Dollar Index (USDX).

== Currency strength based trading indicators ==
There are two types of currency strength calculations: fundamental based, and price based.

Generally, price based currency strength is calculated from the USDX, which is used as a reference for other currency indexes. The basic idea behind indicators is "to buy strong currency and to sell weak currency". If X/Y currency pair is up trend, it can be determined whether this happens due to X's strength or Y's weakness. For the calculation of indexes of this kind, major currencies are usually used because they represent up to 90% of the whole forex market volume.

In some cases, fundamental-based currency strength (also called macro currency strength) is calculated by aggregating leading economic reports such as ISM Reports, consumer surveys (UMCSI), Interest rates, and other macroeconomic indicators.

Using such indicators allows traders to identify the most valuable pairs to trade, observe how currencies react to correlated assets (e.g., CAD/OIL or AUD/GOLD), detect strong trends, and view much of the forex market on a single chart. Recent developments in currency strength indicators involve combining multiple currency indexes to make forex movements more clearly visible.

=== Examples ===
Typical examples of indicators based on currency strength are relative currency strength and absolute currency strength (percentage). Their combination is called the "Forex Flow indicator", because one can see the whole currency flow across the forex market.

== See also ==
- Relative currency strength
- Balance of trade
- Technical analysis
- Hard currency
- Revaluation
