= Beta 2 Limited =

British Forex and precious metal trading business

- Company type: Private company
- Industry: Financial services
- Founded: 2007
- Defunct: May 2016
- Fate: Liquidated
- Headquarters: London, United Kingdom
- Area served: United Kingdom
- Key people: Lane Clark (Managing director)
- Products: forex trading, precious metal trading
- Website: www.beta2.co.uk

Beta 2 Limited was a British forex and precious metal trading business located in the City Of London. It went into liquidation in May 2016. Its managing director was Lane Clark.

== History ==
Founded in November 2007 the company was registered by the Financial Services Authority, FSA reg No. 529092, permitting them to arrange and advise on investments other than Pension Transfers and Pension opt outs.

Founded during the credit crunch of 2007 the company also experienced the flash crash of 2010.
