= Salaries in Iran =

Salaries in Iran were considerably devaluated in recent years the as Iran struggles with economic sanctions and rising inflation rates. The result is a decrease in the purchasing power of salaries. The result is that more and more citizens cannot provide themselves with the most basic needs as were defined by the government.

== Salaries and gender wage gap ==
In 2010, the average net salary in Iran was $708.33.

As of 2025, the average salary in Iran is approximately 5,376,003,000 IRR per year, with most salaries falling from 1,356,003,000 IRR to 12,000,000,000 IRR annually.

Gender based pay gaps exist in Iran, with males earning 11–12% more than females. For example, male physicists earn approximately 1,235,999,900 IRR, while females earn 1,113,601,700 IRR—an 11% gap. Male administrative law judges earn, on average, 1,619,999,400 IRR, compared to 1,452,001,600 IRR for females—showing a 12% gap. Male economists earn 934,798,400 IRR, while women earn 842,398,300 IRR, reflecting an 11% difference. Male office clerks earn around 248,398,700 IRR, while their female counterparts earn 224,398,200 IRR, showing a similar 11% gap. While some of this difference can be attributed towards women working part time, some of it is unequal pay for the same work.

== Salaries in the public sector ==
As of 2025, the average annual salary for a civil servant in Iran is approximately 1,884,018,000 IRR, with a typical range between 976,816,000 IRR and 2,880,013,000 IRR per year.

The median annual salary is 1,800,005,000 IRR, the 25th percentile wage is 1,247,991,000 IRR, and the 75th percentile salary is 2,243,982,000 IRR.

The salaries increase with experience. After 0–2 years, a civil servant earns approximately 1,110,018,000 IRR; after 2–5 years, a civil servant earns around 1,488,003,000 IRR; after 5–10 years - about 1,932,019,000 IRR; after 10–15 years, approximately 2,340,006,000 IRR, after 15–20 years around 2,556,003,000 IRR, and after 20+ years about 2,699,981,000 IRR.

Salaries are also affected by the level of education. A civil servant with a high school diploma earns approximately 1,319,983,000 IRR, and a civil servant with a BA earns about 1,884,018,000 IRR.

Civil servants in Iran receive an average pay raise of 9% every 20 months, which translates to approximately 5.4% annually. Approximately 23% of civil servants reported receiving at least one bonus in the past year, with bonus rates ranging from 1% to 3%.

== Salaries in the armed forces ==
In Iran, an armed forces officer typically earns an average annual salary of approximately 4,476,014,000 Iranian Rials (IRR), which equates to a monthly income of about 373,001,160 IRR. Salaries in this profession generally range from a minimum of 2,327,994,000 IRR to a maximum of 6,839,993,000 IRR per year. In comparison to the private sector, public sector employees in Iran, including Armed Forces Officers, earn approximately 10% more than their private sector counterparts.

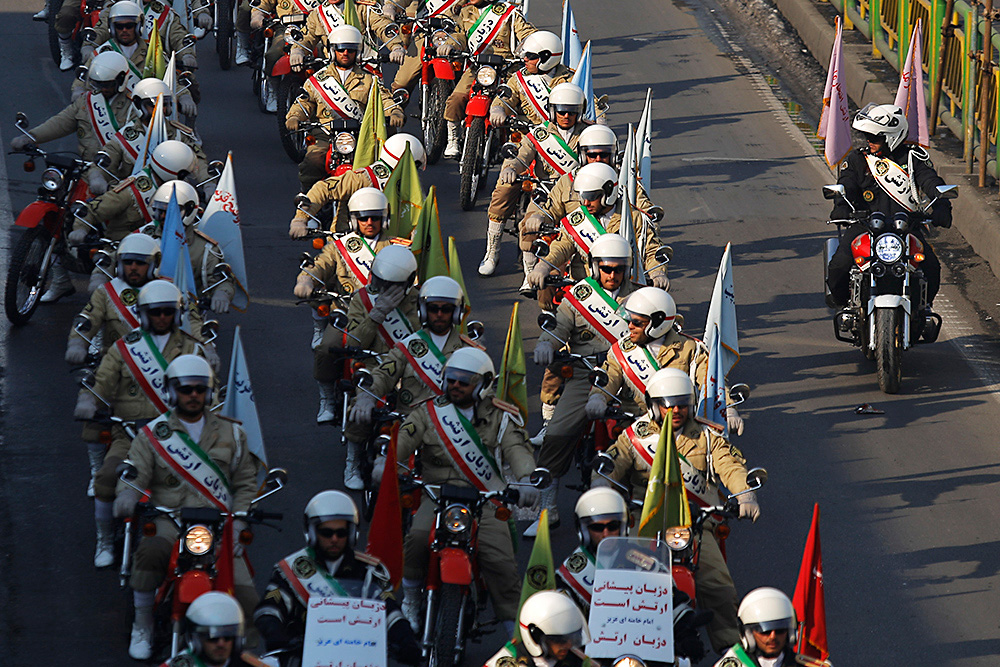
Iranian Armed Forces Motorcyclists in Tehran

The median salary for an armed forces officer is around 4,296,003,000 IRR annually, indicating that half of the individuals in this role earn less than this amount while the other half earn more. Additionally, 25% of officers earn less than 2,975,996,000 IRR, and 75% earn more than this figure. Conversely, 75% of officers earn less than 5,339,986,000 IRR, with the top 25% earning above this threshold.

Experience also influences earnings in this field. Officers with less than two years of experience can expect an average annual salary of approximately 2,640,001,000 IRR. This average increases to about 3,539,995,000 IRR for those with two to five years of experience and to around 4,607,991,000 IRR for five to ten years of service. With ten to fifteen years of experience, the average salary rises to approximately 5,579,987,000 IRR, and for those with fifteen to twenty years, it reaches about 6,095,986,000 IRR. Officers boasting over twenty years of experience can anticipate an average annual income of around 6,408,003,000 IRR.

Educational attainment also plays a crucial role in determining salary levels. Officers who have completed high school earn an average of 3,180,005,000 IRR annually. Those holding a certificate or diploma see an increase to about 3,635,988,000 IRR. A bachelor's degree elevates the average salary to approximately 5,124,007,000 IRR, while a master's degree further boosts it to around 6,215,988,000 IRR annually.

Regarding salary progression, Armed Forces Officers in Iran receive an average pay raise of about 12% every 18 months. This is higher than the national average across all professions, which is around 8% every 19 months. Bonuses are relatively uncommon in this field, with 24% of officers reporting receiving at least one bonus in the past year. For those who did receive bonuses, the amounts typically ranged between 1% and 3% of their annual salary.

== The salaries in the IRGC and the Basij ==
According to reports, IRGC soldiers receive an average monthly salary of approximately $150, which is about half the salary of a computer programmer in Iran and less than that of a school teacher.

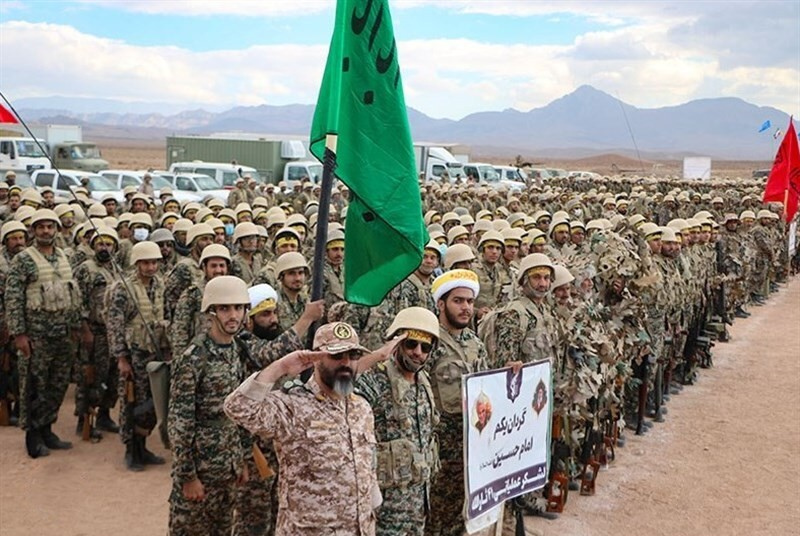
Islamic Revolutionary Guard Corps Ground Force

In 2025, Iran introduced a new salary structure for its soldiers, including those in the IRGC, with monthly salaries ranging from $60 to $100, depending on factors such as service location, marital status, and number of children. or compensation varies for IRGC personnel deployed abroad. In Syria, for instance, the maximum salary for Iranian IRGC forces is reported to be $150 per month.

Active Basij members are compensated for specific projects, with reports from 2025 indicating payments of approximately $8 per day, a sum exceeding the monthly salary of a teacher at that time.

== The minimum wage in Iran ==
In March 2024, the Iranian government increased the basic minimum wage by 35%, setting it at 110 million rials (approximately $186) with benefits. Despite this raise, the new wage covers only about half of the estimated $400 monthly expenses required for a household of three in Tehran. Iran has been grappling with an inflation rate around 50%, and since 2018, the rial has depreciated 15-fold, reaching historic lows. Job listings in Tehran reflect these economic challenges, with positions such as supermarket workers, fast food employees, and cleaners offering monthly salaries ranging from $116 to $300 for extensive work hours, often without benefits like insurance. Some advertisements claim higher salaries, but these often come with significant conditions or are misleading upon further inquiry. This economic disparity highlights the severe financial strain on Iranian workers, who struggle to afford basic necessities despite long working hours.

== Salaries and inflation ==
Over the past seven years, Iran has experienced an increase in income and wealth disparities, exacerbated by rising inflation and the depreciation of the national currency. According to a report from the Statistical Center of Iran, the top 20% of the population now holds 47% of the nation's wealth, while the bottom 20% possesses a mere 0.5%. The Gini coefficient, a measure of economic inequality, has risen to 40, comparable to countries like the United States and Saudi Arabia. This growing inequality is attributed to factors such as the substantial devaluation of the rial, which has led individuals with disposable income to invest in assets like foreign currencies, gold, and real estate to preserve their wealth. Consequently, these investments have driven up prices, further widening the economic gap. Meanwhile, individuals with fixed incomes have seen their purchasing power diminish, leading to an increase in the poverty rate, with approximately 33% of Iranians now living below the poverty line.

On 23/02/2025, a government agency announced an annual rate of 35%. However, labor groups and analysts argue that the government minimizes negative economic news, implying that the actual inflation rate is considerably higher. The Iranian rial has depreciated by more than 50% over the past six months, fueling expectations of even higher inflation. Currently, the minimum wage is approximately $120 per month, while semi-official estimates suggest that a family of three requires at least $400 per month to meet its basic needs.

== Salaries and poverty ==
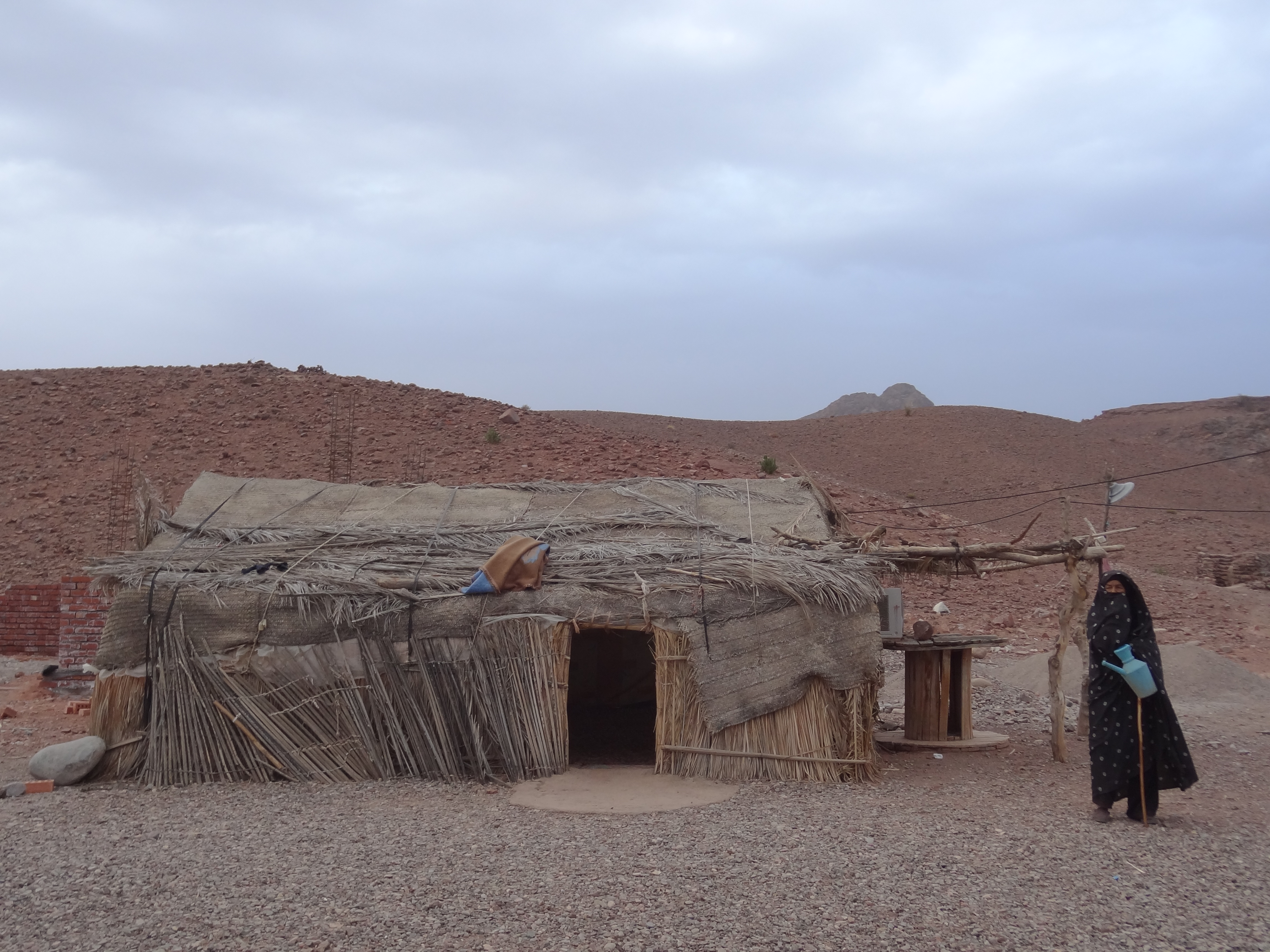
Poverty in Iran- Kerman & Balochestan Province

As of March 2022, over 32 million Iranians—more than one-third of the population—were living below the poverty line and facing food insecurity, according to a report by the Iran Chamber of Commerce Research Center. This situation has been exacerbated by decades of double-digit inflation, which has significantly worsened since 2019, surpassing 40 percent. The report attributes the surge in inflation to U.S. economic sanctions imposed in 2018, leading to a sharp devaluation of Iran's national currency and reduced oil exports. Consequently, food poverty in Iran increased from 18 million people in 2017 to over 26 million by 2020. The study also highlights systemic issues fueling inflation, such as government inefficiency, excessive public sector spending, and reliance on printing money to cover budget deficits. Given these challenges, the report suggests that monetary and fiscal policies should focus on stabilizing inflation to stimulate production, rather than pursuing significant reductions.
