= Functional currency =

Primary accounting unit in a business

Functional currency or base currency refers to the main currency used by a business or a unit within a business. It is the monetary unit of account of the principal economic environment in which an economic entity operates and the currency used for accounting purposes. (Note: Although "base currency" is sometimes used as a synonym, "functional currency" is the more precise term.)

International Accounting Standards (IAS) and U.S. Generally Accepted Accounting Principles (GAAP) provide rules for translation of foreign currency transactions and financial statements. SFAS 52 introduced the concept of functional currency, defined as "the currency of the primary economic environment in which the entity operates; normally, that is, the currency of the environment in which an entity primarily generates and expends cash".

Businesses may enter into transactions (sales, payments, etc.) in multiple currencies. Each qualified business unit (QBU) of the business translates these items to its functional currency at an appropriate exchange rate. It then prepares periodic reports of its position (balance sheet) and activity (income and cash flow statements) in its functional currency. For example, a British bank may have a "base currency" or accounting currency of GBP, because all profits and losses are converted to GBP. If a EUR/USD position is closed out with a profit in USD by a British bank, then the "rate-to-base" will be expressed as a GBP/USD rate. Choice of base currency may depend on location, statutory considerations such as where there are foreign exchange controls, commercial risk management or customer preference. Where a company maintains a foreign currency account in order to pay key suppliers' in the supplier's preferred currency, transaction values will be converted back into the base currency for accounting purposes.

When various QBUs are combined, these reports are translated and consolidated to become financial statements. Translation of statements may result in translation differences, which are accounted for as a cumulative translation adjustment.

Transactions are often translated at the spot rate, i.e., the rate of exchange between the transaction currency and the functional currency on the date of the transaction. Example: a person traveling on business pays a hotel bill for SFR 200. Their home currency is the GBP. On the day they pay the bill, the exchange rate is SFR2 = GBP 1, so they record an expense of GBP 100. Alternatively, businesses may record transactions in another currency using some sort of standard rate for some period, such as the average rate for the month.

Businesses using the accrual method of accounting may recognize revenue or expense in one period and receive or pay it in another. In the intervening period the exchange rate may have changed. When an accrued item is settled, the difference due to exchange rate movement in the amount accrued and the amount settled is treated as foreign exchange gain or loss. This gain or loss is recognized in the same manner as the underlying transactions, such as an ordinary travel expense.

== See also ==
- Inflation accounting
- Inflation
- Economics
- Money
- Banking
- Business
- Hyperinflation
- Historical cost
- Money illusion
- List of countries by foreign-exchange reserves
