= Currency pair =

Quotation of the relative value of two currencies

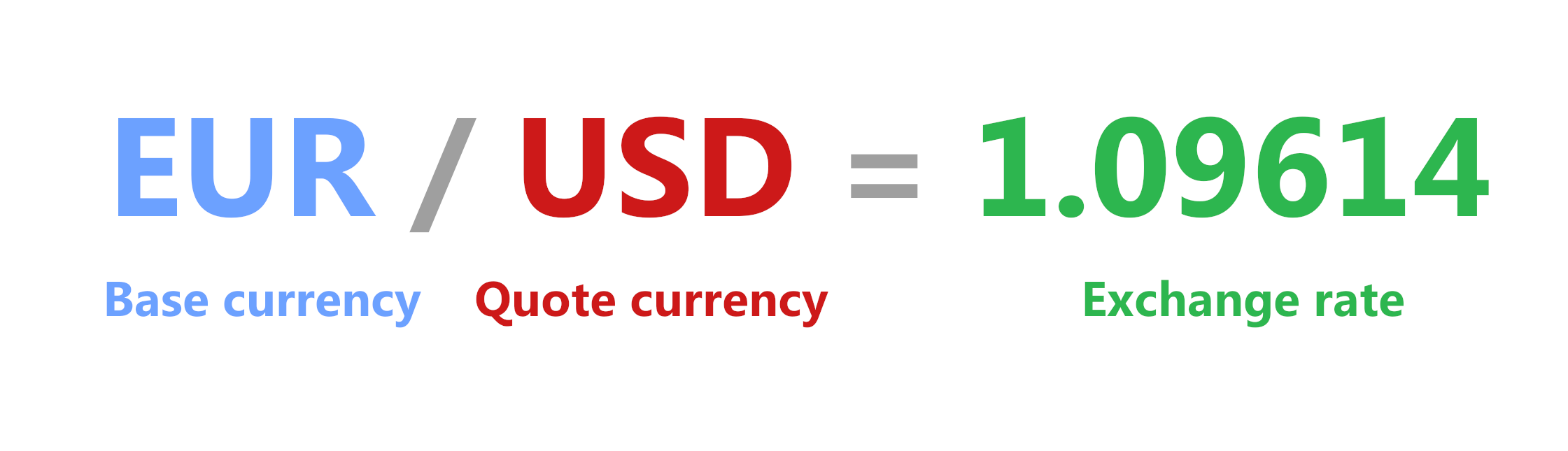
A currency pair. A person would need 1.09614 US dollars to purchase one Euro.

A currency pair is the quotation of the relative value of a currency unit against the unit of another currency in the foreign exchange market. The currency that is used as the reference is called the counter currency, quote currency, or currency and the currency that is quoted in relation is called the base currency or transaction currency.

Currency pairs are generally written by concatenating the ISO currency codes (ISO 4217) of the base currency and the counter currency, and then separating the two codes with a slash. Alternatively the slash may be omitted, or replaced by either a dot or a dash. A widely traded currency pair is the relation of the euro against the US dollar, designated as EUR/USD. The quotation EUR/USD 1.2500 means that one euro is exchanged for 1.2500 US dollars. Here, EUR is the base currency and USD is the quote currency (counter currency). This means that 1 Euro can be exchangeable to 1.25 US Dollars.

The most traded currency pairs in the world are called the Majors. They involve the currencies euro, US dollar, pound sterling, Australian dollar, Canadian dollar, and the Swiss franc.

== Syntax and quotation ==
Currency quotations use the abbreviations for currencies that are prescribed by the International Organization for Standardization (ISO) in standard ISO 4217. The major currencies and their designation in the foreign exchange market are the US dollar (USD), Euro (EUR), Japanese yen (JPY), British pound (GBP), Australian dollar (AUD), Canadian dollar (CAD), and the Swiss franc (CHF).

As mentioned previously, the quotation EUR/USD 1.2500 (or EURUSD 1.2500) means that one euro is exchanged for 1.2500 US dollars. If the quote changes from EUR/USD 1.2500 (or EURUSD 1.2500) to 1.2510, the euro has increased in relative value by 10 pips (Percentage in point), because either the dollar buying strength has weakened or the euro has strengthened, or both. On the other hand, if the EUR/USD (or EURUSD) quote changes from 1.2500 to 1.2490 the euro has become relatively weaker than the dollar.

== Base currency ==
Most traded currencies by value Currency distribution of global foreign exchange market turnover
Currency	ISO 4217 code	Proportion of daily volume		Change (2022–2025)
Currency	ISO 4217 code	April 2022	April 2025	Change (2022–2025)
U.S. dollar	USD	88.4%	89.2%	▲0.8pp
Euro	EUR	30.6%	28.9%	▼1.7pp
Japanese yen	JPY	16.7%	16.8%	▲0.1pp
Pound sterling	GBP	12.9%	10.2%	▼2.7pp
Renminbi	CNY	7.0%	8.5%	▲1.5pp
Swiss franc	CHF	5.2%	6.4%	▲1.2pp
Australian dollar	AUD	6.4%	6.1%	▼0.3pp
Canadian dollar	CAD	6.2%	5.8%	▼0.4pp
Hong Kong dollar	HKD	2.6%	3.8%	▲1.2pp
Singapore dollar	SGD	2.4%	2.4%	Steady
Indian rupee	INR	1.6%	1.9%	▲0.3pp
South Korean won	KRW	1.8%	1.8%	Steady
Swedish krona	SEK	2.2%	1.6%	▼0.6pp
Mexican peso	MXN	1.5%	1.6%	▲0.1pp
New Zealand dollar	NZD	1.7%	1.5%	▼0.2pp
Norwegian krone	NOK	1.7%	1.3%	▼0.4pp
New Taiwan dollar	TWD	1.1%	1.2%	▲0.1pp
Brazilian real	BRL	0.9%	0.9%	Steady
South African rand	ZAR	1.0%	0.8%	▼0.2pp
Polish złoty	PLN	0.7%	0.8%	▲0.1pp
Danish krone	DKK	0.7%	0.7%	Steady
Indonesian rupiah	IDR	0.4%	0.7%	▲0.3pp
Turkish lira	TRY	0.4%	0.5%	▲0.1pp
Thai baht	THB	0.4%	0.5%	▲0.1pp
Israeli new shekel	ILS	0.4%	0.4%	Steady
Hungarian forint	HUF	0.3%	0.4%	▲0.1pp
Czech koruna	CZK	0.4%	0.4%	Steady
Chilean peso	CLP	0.3%	0.3%	Steady
Philippine peso	PHP	0.2%	0.2%	Steady
Colombian peso	COP	0.2%	0.2%	Steady
Malaysian ringgit	MYR	0.2%	0.2%	Steady
UAE dirham	AED	0.4%	0.1%	▼0.3pp
Saudi riyal	SAR	0.2%	0.1%	▼0.1pp
Romanian leu	RON	0.1%	0.1%	Steady
Peruvian sol	PEN	0.1%	0.1%	Steady
Other currencies		2.6%	3.4%	▲0.8pp
Total (Note: The total sum is 200% because each currency trade is counted twice: once for the currency being bought and once for the currency being sold. The percentages above represent the proportion of all trades involving a given currency, regardless of which side of the transaction it is on.)		200.0%	200.0%	

The rules for formulating standard currency pair notations result from accepted priorities attributed to each currency.

From its inception in 1999 and as stipulated by the European Central Bank, the euro has first precedence as a base currency. Therefore, all currency pairs involving it should use it as their base, listed first. For example, the US dollar and euro exchange rate is identified as EUR/USD.

Although there is no standards-setting body or ruling organization, the established priority ranking of the major currencies is:

1. euro
2. pound sterling
3. Australian dollar
4. United States dollar
5. Canadian dollar
6. Swiss franc
7. Japanese yen

Historically, this was established by a ranking according to the relative values of the currencies with respect to each other, but the introduction of the euro and other market factors have broken the original price rankings. For example, while historically Japanese yen would rank above Mexican peso, the quoting convention for these is now MXNJPY, i.e. Mexican peso has higher priority than Japanese yen.

Other currencies (the Minors) are generally quoted against USD. Quotes against major currencies other than USD are referred to as currency crosses, or simply crosses. The most common crosses are EUR, JPY, and GBP crosses, but may be a major currency crossed with any other currency. The rates are almost universally derived, however, by taking the first currency's rate against the USD and multiplying/dividing by the second currency's rate against the USD.

Sometimes the term base currency may also refer to the functional currency of a bank or company, usually their domestic currency. For example, a British bank may use GBP as a base currency for accounting, because all profits and losses are converted to sterling. If a EUR/USD position is closed out with a profit in USD by a British bank, then the rate-to-base will be expressed as a GBP/USD rate. This ambiguity leads many market participants to use the expressions currency 1 (CCY1) and currency 2 (CCY2), where one unit of CCY1 equals the quoted number of units of CCY2.

== The Majors ==
The most traded pairs of currencies in the world are called the Majors. They constitute the largest share of the foreign exchange market, about 85%, and therefore they exhibit high market liquidity.

The Majors are: EUR/USD, USD/JPY, GBP/USD, AUD/USD, USD/CHF and USD/CAD.

== Nicknames ==
In everyday foreign exchange market trading and news reporting, the currency pairs are often referred to by nicknames rather than their symbolic nomenclature. These are often reminiscent of national or geographic connotations. The GBP/USD pairing is known by traders as cable (also the cable), which has its origins from the time when a communications cable under the Atlantic Ocean synchronized the GBP/USD quote between the London and New York markets. GBP is also referred to by traders as quid. The following nicknames are common: "Swissy" or "Euro-Swissy" for EUR/CHF, Fiber for EUR/USD, Chunnel for EUR/GBP, Loonie and The Funds for USD/CAD, Aussie for AUD/USD, Gopher for USD/JPY, Guppy for GBP/JPY, Yuppy for EUR/JPY pairing. New innovations include Barney for USD/RUB and Betty for EUR/RUB after the fictional characters the Rubbles in The Flintstones. Nicknames vary between the trading centers in New York, London, and Tokyo.

Care should be taken with the use of Betty for EUR/RUB as, in London markets, Betty is used as Cockney Rhyming slang for cable (as in: Betty Grable = cable = GBP/USD).

== Exotic pairs ==
Alongside forex major and minor pairs are the combination of pairs known as "exotic pairs". These pairs involve a major currency - like USD, EUR, GBP, or the JPY - alongside a thinly-traded currency that holds minimal trading volume within the foreign exchange market. Such pairs include EUR/TRY, USD/SGD, USD/HKD, and GBP/SEK, to name a few. Since trading volume is less present within these pairs, there is a lack of market depth, leading to wider spreads. As a result, these pairs become high risk to trade; hence, the term "exotic pairs". The high level of risk, unique trading opportunity, and increased volatility behind exotic pairs pushes most retail traders the opposite way; however, when traded by experienced traders within season, the trading of exotic pairs offers the potential for high returns. The high volatility of these pairs is due to the pairing of a strong major currency with a more developing and unstable currency.

== Cross pairs ==
The currency pairs that do not involve USD are called cross currency pairs, such as GBP/JPY. Pairs that involve the euro are often called euro crosses, such as EUR/GBP.

== Trading ==
AUD/JPY since 1978

Currencies are traded in fixed contract sizes, specifically called lot sizes, or multiples thereof. The standard lot size is 100,000 units. Many retail trading firms also offer 10,000-unit (mini lot) trading accounts and a few even 1,000-unit (micro lot).

The officially quoted rate is a spot price. In a trading market however, currencies are offered for sale at an offering price (the ask price), and traders looking to buy a position seek to do so at their bid price, which is always lower than the asking price. This price differential is known as the spread. For example, if the quotation of EUR/USD is 1.3607/1.3609, then the spread is US$0.0002, or 2 pips. In general, markets with high liquidity exhibit smaller spreads than less frequently traded markets.

The spread offered to a retail customer with an account at a brokerage firm, rather than a large international forex market maker, is larger and varies between brokerages. Brokerages typically increase the spread they receive from their market providers as compensation for their service to the end customer, rather than charge a transaction fee. A bureau de change usually has spreads that are even larger.

- Example: consider EUR/USD currency pair traded at a quotation of 1.33

In the above case, someone buying 1 euro will have to pay US$1.33; conversely one selling 1 euro will receive US$1.33 (assuming no FX spread). Forex traders buy EUR/USD pair if they believe that the euro would increase in value relative to the US dollar, buying EUR/USD pair; this way is called going long on the pair; conversely, would sell EUR/USD pair, called going short on the pair, if they believe the value of the euro will go down relative to the US dollar. A pair is depicted only one way and never reversed for the purpose of a trade, but a buy or sell function is used at initiation of a trade. Buy a pair if bullish on the first position as compared to the second of the pair; conversely, sell if bearish on the first as compared to the second.

== See also ==
- Currency strength
- Foreign exchange option
- Currency Commission
- Statistical arbitrage
