= Foreign exchange market =

Global decentralized trading of international currencies

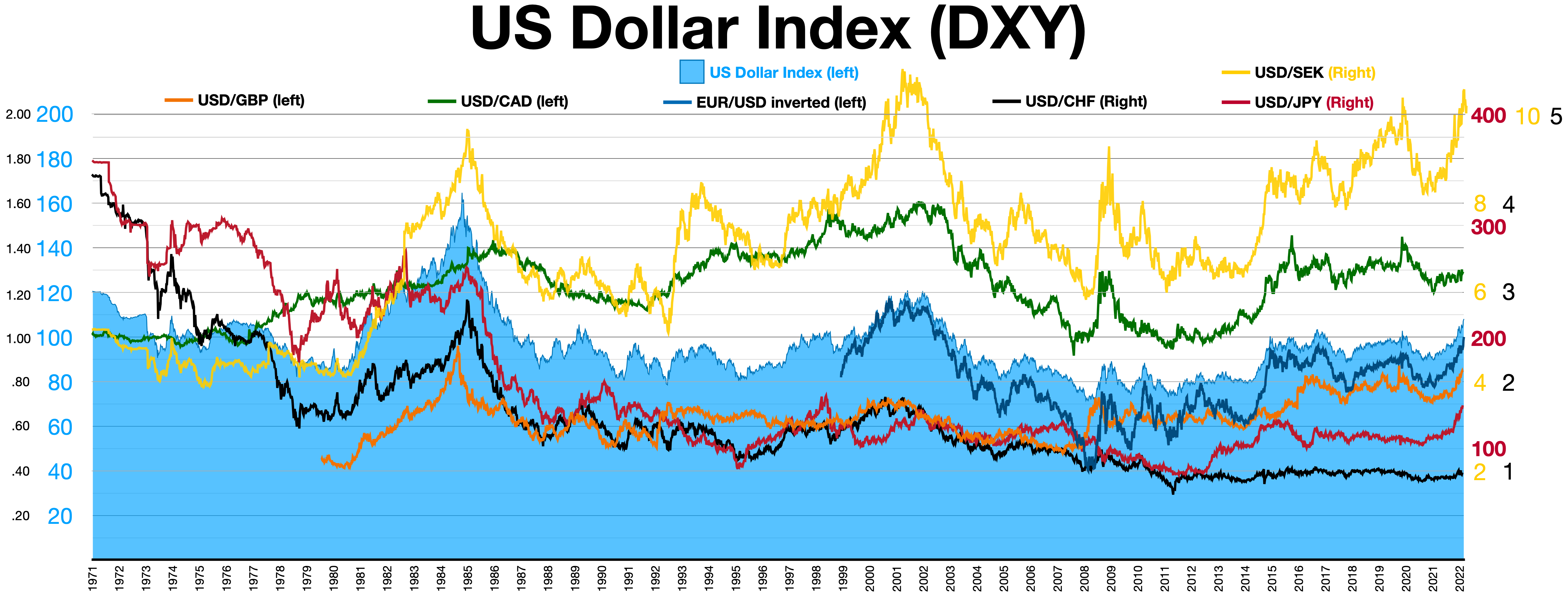
US Dollar Index DXY US Dollar Index (DXY) USD/GBP exchange rate USD/Canadian dollar exchange rate EUR/USD (inverted) exchange rate USD/JPY exchange rate USD/SEK exchange rate USD/CHF exchange rate

The foreign exchange market (forex, FX, or currency market) is a global decentralized or over-the-counter (OTC) market for the trading of currencies. This market determines foreign exchange rates for every currency. By trading volume, it is by far the largest market in the world, followed by the credit market.

The main participants are the larger international banks. Financial centres function as anchors of trading between a range of multiple types of buyers and sellers around the clock, with the exception of weekends. As currencies are always traded in pairs, the market does not set a currency's absolute value, but rather determines its relative value by setting the market price of one currency if paid for with another. Example: 1 USD is worth 1.1 Euros or 1.2 Swiss Francs etc. The market works through financial institutions and operates on several levels. Behind the scenes, banks turn to a smaller number of financial firms known as "dealers", who are involved in large quantities of trading. Most foreign exchange dealers are banks, so this behind-the-scenes market is sometimes called the "interbank market". Trades between dealers can be very large, involving hundreds of millions of dollars. Because of the sovereignty issue when involving two currencies, Forex has little supervisory entity regulating its actions. In a typical foreign exchange transaction, a party purchases some quantity of one currency by paying with some quantity of another currency.

The foreign exchange market assists international trade and investments by enabling currency conversion. For example, it permits a business in the US to import goods from European Union member states, and pay Euros, even though its income is in United States dollars. It also supports direct speculation and evaluation relative to the value of currencies and the carry trade speculation, based on the differential interest rate between two currencies.

The modern foreign exchange market began forming during the 1970s. This followed three decades of government restrictions on foreign exchange transactions under the Bretton Woods system of monetary management, which set out the rules for commercial and financial relations among major industrial states after World War II. Countries gradually switched to floating exchange rates from the previous exchange rate regime, which remained fixed per the Bretton Woods system. The foreign exchange market is unique because of the following characteristics:

- huge trading volume, representing the largest asset class in the world leading to high liquidity;
- geographical dispersion;
- continuous operation: 24 hours a day except weekends, i.e., trading from 22:00 UTC on Sunday (Sydney) until 22:00 UTC Friday (New York);
- variety of factors that affect exchange rates;
- low profit margins compared with other markets of fixed income; and
- use of leverage to enhance profit and loss margins and with respect to account size.

As such, it has been referred to as the market closest to the ideal of perfect competition, notwithstanding currency intervention by central banks.

Trading in foreign exchange markets averaged US$9.6 trillion per day in April 2025, up from US$7.5 trillion in 2022. Measured by value, foreign exchange swaps were traded more than any other instrument in 2025, at US$4 trillion per day, followed by spot trading at US$3 trillion.

== History ==
=== Ancient ===
Currency trading and exchange first occurred in ancient times. Money-changers (people helping others to change money and also taking a commission or charging a fee) were living in the Holy Land in the times of the Talmudic writings (Biblical times). These people (sometimes called "kollybistẻs") used city stalls, and at feast times the Temple's Court of the Gentiles instead. Money-changers were also the silversmiths and/or goldsmiths of more recent ancient times.

During the 4th century AD, the Byzantine government kept a monopoly on the exchange of currency.

Papyri PCZ I 59021 (c.259/8 BC), shows the occurrences of exchange of coinage in Ancient Egypt.

Currency and exchange were important elements of trade in the ancient world, enabling people to buy and sell items like food, pottery, and raw materials. If a Greek coin held more gold than an Egyptian coin due to its size or content, then a merchant could barter fewer Greek gold coins for more Egyptian ones, or for more material goods. This is why, at some point in their history, most world currencies in circulation today had a value fixed to a specific quantity of a recognized standard like silver and gold.

=== Medieval and later ===
During the 15th century, the Medici family were required to open banks at foreign locations in order to exchange currencies to act on behalf of textile merchants. To facilitate trade, the bank created the nostro (from Italian, this translates to "ours") account book which contained two columned entries showing amounts of foreign and local currencies; information pertaining to the keeping of an account with a foreign bank. During the 17th (or 18th) century, Amsterdam maintained an active Forex market. In 1704, foreign exchange took place between agents acting in the interests of the Kingdom of England and the County of Holland.

=== Early modern ===
Alex. Brown & Sons traded foreign currencies around 1850 and was a leading currency trader in the USA. In 1880, J.M. do Espírito Santo de Silva (Banco Espírito Santo) applied for and was given permission to engage in a foreign exchange trading business.

The year 1880 is considered by at least one source to be the beginning of modern foreign exchange: the gold standard began in that year.

Prior to the First World War, there was a much more limited control of international trade. Motivated by the onset of war, countries abandoned the gold standard monetary system.

=== Modern to post-modern ===
From 1899 to 1913, holdings of countries' foreign exchange increased at an annual rate of 10.8%, while holdings of gold increased at an annual rate of 6.3% between 1903 and 1913.

At the end of 1913, nearly half of the world's foreign exchange was conducted using the pound sterling. The number of foreign banks operating within the boundaries of London increased from 3 in 1860, to 71 in 1913. In 1902, there were just two London foreign exchange brokers. At the start of the 20th century, trades in currencies was most active in Paris, New York City and Berlin; Britain remained largely uninvolved until 1914. Between 1919 and 1922, the number of foreign exchange brokers in London increased to 17; and in 1924, there were 40 firms operating for the purposes of exchange.

During the 1920s, the Kleinwort family were known as the leaders of the foreign exchange market, while Japheth, Montagu & Co. and Seligman still warrant recognition as significant FX traders. The trade in London began to resemble its modern manifestation. By 1928, Forex trade was integral to the financial functioning of the city. However, during the 1930s, London's pursuit of widespread trade prosperity was hindered by continental exchange controls and additional factors in Europe and Latin America. Some of these additional factors include tariff rates and quota, protectionist policies, trade barriers and taxes, economic depression and agricultural overproduction, and impact of protection on trade.

==== After World War II ====
In 1944, the Bretton Woods Accord was signed, allowing currencies to fluctuate within a range of ±1% from the currency's par exchange rate. In Japan, the Foreign Exchange Bank Law was introduced in 1954. As a result, the Bank of Tokyo became a center of foreign exchange by September 1954. Between 1954 and 1959, Japanese law was changed to allow foreign exchange dealings in many more Western currencies.

U.S. President Richard Nixon is credited with ending the Bretton Woods Accord and fixed rates of exchange, eventually resulting in a free-floating currency system. After the Accord ended in 1971, the Smithsonian Agreement allowed rates to fluctuate by up to ±2%. In 1961–62, the volume of foreign operations by the U.S. Federal Reserve was relatively low. Those responsible for managing exchange rates then found the boundaries of the Agreement unrealistic. As a result, it led to its discontinuation in March 1973. Afterwards, none of the major currencies (such as the US dollar, the British pound, or the Japanese yen) were maintained with a capacity for conversion to gold. Instead, organizations relied on reserves of currency to facilitate international trade and back the value of their own currency. From 1970 to 1973, the volume of trading in the market increased three-fold. At some time (according to Gandolfo during February–March 1973) some of the markets were "split", and a two-tier currency market was subsequently introduced, with dual currency rates. This was abolished in March 1974.

Reuters introduced computer monitors during June 1973, replacing the telephones and telex used previously for trading quotes.

==== Markets close ====
Due to the ultimate ineffectiveness of the Bretton Woods Accord and the European Joint Float, the forex markets were forced to close sometime during 1972 and March 1973. This was a result of the collapse of the Bretton Woods System, as major currencies began to float against each other, ultimately leading to the abandonment of the fixed exchange rate system. Meanwhile, the largest purchase of US dollars in the history of 1976 was when the West German government achieved an almost 3 billion dollar acquisition (a figure is given as 2.75 billion in total by The Statesman: Volume 18 1974). This event indicated the impossibility of balancing of exchange rates by the measures of control used at the time, and the monetary system and the foreign exchange markets in West Germany and other countries within Europe closed for two weeks (during February and, or, March 1973. Giersch, Paqué, & Schmieding state closed after purchase of "7.5 million Dmarks" Brawley states "... Exchange markets had to be closed. When they re-opened ... March 1 " that is a large purchase occurred after the close).

==== After 1973 ====
In developed nations, state control of foreign exchange trading ended in 1973 when complete floating and relatively free market conditions of modern times began. Other sources claim that the first time a currency pair was traded by U.S. retail customers was during 1982, with additional currency pairs becoming available by the next year.

On 1 January 1981, as part of changes beginning during 1978, the People's Bank of China allowed certain domestic "enterprises" to participate in foreign exchange trading. Sometime during 1981, the South Korean government ended Forex controls and allowed free trade to occur for the first time. During 1988, the country's government accepted the IMF quota for international trade.

Intervention by European banks (especially the Bundesbank) influenced the Forex market on 27 February 1985. The greatest proportion of all trades worldwide during 1987 were within the United Kingdom (slightly over one quarter). The United States had the second highest involvement in trading.

During 1991, Iran changed international agreements with some countries from oil-barter to foreign exchange.

== Market size and liquidity ==
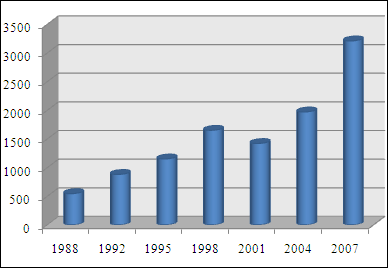
Main foreign exchange market turnover, 1988–2007, measured in billions of USD

The foreign exchange market is the most liquid financial market in the world. Traders include governments and central banks, commercial banks, other institutional investors and financial institutions, currency speculators, other commercial corporations, and individuals. According to the 2025 Triennial Central Bank Survey, coordinated by the Bank for International Settlements, average daily turnover was $9.6 trillion in April 2025 (compared to $4 trillion in 2010). Of this $9.6 trillion, $3 trillion was spot transactions and $6.6 trillion was traded in outright forwards, swaps, and other derivatives.

Foreign exchange is traded in an over-the-counter market where brokers/dealers negotiate directly with one another, so there is no central exchange or clearing house. The biggest geographic trading center is the United Kingdom, primarily London. In April 2025, trading in the United Kingdom accounted for 37.8% of the total, making it by far the most important center for foreign exchange trading in the world. Owing to London's dominance in the market, a particular currency's quoted price is usually the London market price. For instance, when the International Monetary Fund calculates the value of its special drawing rights every day, they use the London market prices at noon that day. Trading in the United States accounted for 18.6%, Singapore and Hong Kong account for 11.8% and 7.0%, respectively, and Japan accounted for 3.5%.

Turnover of exchange-traded foreign exchange futures and options was growing rapidly in 2004–2013, reaching $145 billion in April 2013 (double the turnover recorded in April 2007). As of April 2025, exchange-traded currency derivatives represent 2% of OTC foreign exchange turnover. Foreign exchange futures contracts were introduced in 1972 at the Chicago Mercantile Exchange and are traded more than to most other futures contracts.

Most developed countries permit the trading of derivative products (such as futures and options on futures) on their exchanges. All these developed countries already have fully convertible capital accounts. Some governments of emerging markets do not allow foreign exchange derivative products on their exchanges because they have capital controls. The use of derivatives is growing in many emerging economies. Countries such as South Korea, South Africa, and India have established currency futures exchanges, despite having some capital controls.

Foreign exchange trading increased by 20% between April 2007 and April 2010 and has more than doubled since 2004. The increase in turnover is due to a number of factors: the growing importance of foreign exchange as an asset class, the increased trading activity of high-frequency traders, and the emergence of retail investors as an important market segment. The growth of electronic execution and the diverse selection of execution venues has lowered transaction costs, increased market liquidity, and attracted greater participation from many customer types. In particular, electronic trading via online portals has made it easier for retail traders to trade in the foreign exchange market. By 2010, retail trading was estimated to account for up to 10% of spot turnover, or $150 billion per day (see below: Retail foreign exchange traders).

== Market participants ==
Top 10 currency traders % of overall volume, June 2020
Rank	Name	Market share
1	(United States) JPMorgan Chase	10.78%
2	(Switzerland) UBS	8.13%
3	(United Kingdom) XTX Markets	7.58%
4	(Germany) Deutsche Bank	7.38%
5	(United States) Citi	5.50%
6	(United Kingdom) HSBC	5.33%
7	(United States) Jump Trading	5.23%
8	(United States) Goldman Sachs	4.62%
9	(United States) State Street Corporation	4.61%
10	(United States) Bank of America Merrill Lynch	4.50%

Unlike a stock market, the foreign exchange market is divided into levels of access. At the top is the interbank foreign exchange market, which is made up of the largest commercial banks and securities dealers. Within the interbank market, spreads represent the gap between the bid (the highest price a buyer is willing to pay) and ask (the lowest price a seller is willing to accept) prices in trading. Relationships play a role in a bank's access to interbank market liquidity. Banks with reserve imbalances may prefer to borrow from banks with established relationships and can sometimes secure loans at more favorable interest rates compared to other sources.

The difference between the bid and ask prices widens (for example from 0 to 1 pip to 1–2 pips for currencies such as the EUR) as you go down the levels of access. This is due to volume. If a trader can guarantee large numbers of transactions for large amounts, they can demand a smaller difference between the bid and ask price, which is referred to as a better spread. The levels of access that make up the foreign exchange market are determined by the size of the "line" (the amount of money with which they are trading). The top-tier interbank market accounts for 51% of all transactions. After that, smaller banks, large multinational corporations (requiring risk hedging and cross-border payroll), major hedge funds, and even a few retail market makers come into play. According to Galati and Melvin, “Pension funds, insurance companies, mutual funds, and other institutional investors have played an increasingly important role in financial markets in general, and in FX markets in particular, since the early 2000s.” (2004) In addition, he notes, “Hedge funds have grown markedly over the 2001–2004 period in terms of both number and overall size”. Central banks also participate in the foreign exchange market to align currencies to their economic needs.

=== Commercial companies ===
An important part of the foreign exchange market comes from the financial activities of companies seeking foreign exchange to pay for goods or services. Commercial companies often trade fairly small amounts compared to those of banks or speculators, and their trades often have a little short-term impact on market rates. Nevertheless, trade flows are an important factor in the long-term direction of a currency's exchange rate. Some multinational corporations (MNCs) can have an unpredictable impact when very large positions are covered due to exposures that are not widely known by other market participants.

=== Central banks ===
National central banks play an important role in the foreign exchange markets. They try to control the money supply, inflation, and/or interest rates and often have official or unofficial target rates for their currencies. They can use their often substantial foreign exchange reserves to stabilize the market. Nevertheless, the effectiveness of central bank "stabilizing speculation" is doubtful because central banks do not go bankrupt if they make large losses as other traders would. There is also no convincing evidence that they actually make a profit from trading.

=== Foreign exchange fixing ===
Foreign exchange fixing is the daily monetary exchange rate fixed by the national bank of each country. The idea is that central banks use the fixing time and exchange rate to evaluate the behavior of their currency. Fixing exchange rates reflect the real value of equilibrium in the market. Banks, dealers, and traders use fixing rates as a market trend indicator.

The mere expectation or rumor of a central bank foreign exchange intervention might be enough to stabilize the currency. However, aggressive intervention might be used several times each year in countries with a dirty float currency regime. Central banks do not always achieve their objectives. The combined resources of the market can easily overwhelm any central bank. Several scenarios of this nature were seen in the 1992–93 European Exchange Rate Mechanism collapse, and in more recent times in Asia.

=== Investment management firms ===
Investment management firms (who typically manage large accounts on behalf of customers such as pension funds and endowments) use the foreign exchange market to facilitate transactions in foreign securities. For example, an investment manager bearing an international equity portfolio needs to purchase and sell several pairs of foreign currencies to pay for foreign securities purchases.

Some investment management firms also have more speculative specialist currency overlay operations, which manage clients' currency exposures with the aim of generating profits as well as limiting risk. While the number of this type of specialist firms is quite small, many have a large value of assets under management and can, therefore, generate large trades.

=== Retail foreign exchange traders ===
Individual retail speculative traders constitute a growing segment of this market. Currently, they participate indirectly through brokers or banks. Retail brokers, while largely controlled and regulated in the US by the Commodity Futures Trading Commission and National Futures Association, have previously been subjected to periodic foreign exchange fraud. To deal with the issue, in 2010 the NFA required its members that deal in the Forex markets to register as such (i.e., Forex CTA instead of a CTA). Those NFA members that would traditionally be subject to minimum net capital requirements, FCMs and IBs, are subject to greater minimum net capital requirements if they deal in Forex. A number of the foreign exchange brokers operate from the UK under Financial Services Authority regulations where foreign exchange trading using margin is part of the wider over-the-counter derivatives trading industry that includes contracts for difference and financial spread betting.

There are two main types of retail FX brokers offering the opportunity for speculative currency trading: brokers and dealers or market makers. Brokers serve as an agent of the customer in the broader FX market, by seeking the best price in the market for a retail order and dealing on behalf of the retail customer. They charge a commission or "mark-up" in addition to the price obtained in the market. Dealers or market makers, by contrast, typically act as principals in the transaction versus the retail customer, and quote a price they are willing to deal at.

=== Non-bank foreign exchange companies ===
Non-bank foreign exchange companies offer currency exchange and international payments to private individuals and companies. These are also known as "foreign exchange brokers" but are distinct in that they do not offer speculative trading but rather currency exchange with payments (i.e., there is usually a physical delivery of currency to a bank account).

It is estimated that in the UK, 14% of currency transfers/payments are made via Foreign Exchange Companies. These companies' selling point is usually that they will offer better exchange rates or cheaper payments than the customer's bank. These companies differ from Money Transfer/Remittance Companies in that they generally offer higher-value services. The volume of transactions done through Foreign Exchange Companies in India amounts to about US$2 billion per day. This does not compete favorably with any well developed foreign exchange market of international repute, but with the entry of online Foreign Exchange Companies the market is steadily growing. Around 25% of currency transfers/payments in India are made via non-bank Foreign Exchange Companies. Most of these companies use the USP of better exchange rates than the banks. They are regulated by FEDAI and any transaction in foreign Exchange is governed by the Foreign Exchange Management Act, 1999 (FEMA).

=== Money transfer/remittance companies and bureaux de change ===
Money transfer companies/remittance companies perform high-volume low-value transfers generally by economic migrants back to their home country. In 2007, the Aite Group estimated that there were $369 billion of remittances (an increase of 8% on the previous year). The four largest foreign markets (India, China, Mexico, and the Philippines) receive $95 billion. The largest and best-known provider is Western Union with 345,000 agents globally, followed by UAE Exchange.

Bureaux de change or currency transfer companies provide low-value foreign exchange services for travelers. These are typically located at airports and stations or at tourist locations and allow physical notes to be exchanged from one currency to another. They access foreign exchange markets via banks or non-bank foreign exchange companies.

== Most traded currencies by value ==
Most traded currencies by value Currency distribution of global foreign exchange market turnover
Currency	ISO 4217 code	Proportion of daily volume		Change (2022–2025)
Currency	ISO 4217 code	April 2022	April 2025	Change (2022–2025)
United States dollar	USD	88.4%	89.2%	▲0.8pp
Euro	EUR	30.6%	28.9%	▼1.7pp
Japanese yen	JPY	16.7%	16.8%	▲0.1pp
Pound sterling	GBP	12.9%	10.2%	▼2.7pp
Renminbi	CNY	7.0%	8.5%	▲1.5pp
Swiss franc	CHF	5.2%	6.4%	▲1.2pp
Australian dollar	AUD	6.4%	6.1%	▼0.3pp
Canadian dollar	CAD	6.2%	5.8%	▼0.4pp
Hong Kong dollar	HKD	2.6%	3.8%	▲1.2pp
Singapore dollar	SGD	2.4%	2.4%	Steady
Indian rupee	INR	1.6%	1.9%	▲0.3pp
South Korean won	KRW	1.8%	1.8%	Steady
Swedish krona	SEK	2.2%	1.6%	▼0.6pp
Mexican peso	MXN	1.5%	1.6%	▲0.1pp
New Zealand dollar	NZD	1.7%	1.5%	▼0.2pp
Norwegian krone	NOK	1.7%	1.3%	▼0.4pp
New Taiwan dollar	TWD	1.1%	1.2%	▲0.1pp
Brazilian real	BRL	0.9%	0.9%	Steady
South African rand	ZAR	1.0%	0.8%	▼0.2pp
Polish złoty	PLN	0.7%	0.8%	▲0.1pp
Danish krone	DKK	0.7%	0.7%	Steady
Indonesian rupiah	IDR	0.4%	0.7%	▲0.3pp
Turkish lira	TRY	0.4%	0.5%	▲0.1pp
Thai baht	THB	0.4%	0.5%	▲0.1pp
Israeli new shekel	ILS	0.4%	0.4%	Steady
Hungarian forint	HUF	0.3%	0.4%	▲0.1pp
Czech koruna	CZK	0.4%	0.4%	Steady
Chilean peso	CLP	0.3%	0.3%	Steady
Philippine peso	PHP	0.2%	0.2%	Steady
Colombian peso	COP	0.2%	0.2%	Steady
Malaysian ringgit	MYR	0.2%	0.2%	Steady
UAE dirham	AED	0.4%	0.1%	▼0.3pp
Saudi riyal	SAR	0.2%	0.1%	▼0.1pp
Romanian leu	RON	0.1%	0.1%	Steady
Peruvian sol	PEN	0.1%	0.1%	Steady
Other currencies		2.6%	3.4%	▲0.8pp
Total (Note: The total sum is 200% because each currency trade is counted twice: once for the currency being bought and once for the currency being sold. The percentages above represent the proportion of all trades involving a given currency, regardless of which side of the transaction it is on.)		200.0%	200.0%	

There is no unified or centrally cleared market for the majority of trades, and there is very little cross-border regulation. Due to the over-the-counter (OTC) nature of currency markets, there are rather a number of interconnected marketplaces, where different currencies instruments are traded. This implies that there is not a single exchange rate but rather a number of different rates (prices), depending on what bank or market maker is trading, and where it is. In practice, the rates are quite close due to arbitrage. Due to London's dominance in the market, a particular currency's quoted price is usually the London market price. Major trading exchanges include Electronic Broking Services (EBS) and Thomson Reuters Dealing, while major banks also offer trading systems. A joint venture of the Chicago Mercantile Exchange and Reuters, called Fxmarketspace opened in 2007 and aspired but failed to the role of a central market clearing mechanism.

The main currency trading centers are London and New York City, although Singapore, Hong Kong, and Tokyo are all important centers as well. Banks throughout the world participate. Currency trading happens continuously throughout the day; as the Asian trading session ends, the European session begins, followed by the North American session and then back to the Asian session.

Fluctuations in exchange rates are usually caused by actual monetary flows as well as by expectations of changes in monetary flows. These are caused by changes in gross domestic product (GDP) growth, inflation (purchasing power parity theory), interest rates (interest rate parity, Domestic Fisher effect, International Fisher effect), budget and trade deficits or surpluses, large cross-border M&A deals and other macroeconomic conditions. Major news is released publicly, often on scheduled dates, so many people have access to the same news at the same time. However, large banks have an important advantage; they can see their customers' order flow.

Currencies are traded against one another in pairs. Each currency pair thus constitutes an individual trading product and is traditionally noted XXXYYY or XXX/YYY, where XXX and YYY are the ISO 4217 international three-letter code of the currencies involved. The first currency (XXX) is the base currency that is quoted relative to the second currency (YYY), called the counter currency (or quote currency). For instance, the quotation EURUSD (EUR/USD) 1.5465 is the price of the Euro expressed in US dollars, meaning 1 euro = 1.5465 dollars. The market convention is to quote most exchange rates against the USD with the US dollar as the base currency (e.g. USDJPY, USDCAD, USDCHF). The exceptions are the British pound (GBP), Australian dollar (AUD), the New Zealand dollar (NZD) and the euro (EUR) where the USD is the counter currency (e.g. GBPUSD, AUDUSD, NZDUSD, EURUSD).

The factors affecting XXX will affect both XXXYYY and XXXZZZ. This causes a positive currency correlation between XXXYYY and XXXZZZ.

On the spot market, according to the 2025 Triennial Survey, the most heavily traded bilateral currency pairs were:

- USD/EUR: 21.2%
- USD/JPY: 14.3%
- USD/CNY: 8.1%

The U.S. currency was involved in 89.2% of transactions, followed by the euro (28.9%), the yen (16.8%), and sterling (10.2%) (see table). Volume percentages for all individual currencies should add up to 200%, as each transaction involves two currencies.

== Determinants of exchange rates ==
In a fixed exchange rate regime, exchange rates are decided by the government, while a number of theories have been proposed to explain (and predict) the fluctuations in exchange rates in a floating exchange rate regime, including:

- International parity conditions: Relative purchasing power parity, interest rate parity, Domestic Fisher effect, International Fisher effect. To some extent the above theories provide logical explanation for the fluctuations in exchange rates, yet these theories falter as they are based on challengeable assumptions (e.g., free flow of goods, services, and capital) which seldom hold true in the real world.
- Balance of payments model: This model, however, focuses largely on tradable goods and services, ignoring the increasing role of global capital flows. It failed to provide any explanation for the continuous appreciation of the US dollar during the 1980s and most of the 1990s, despite the soaring US current account deficit.
- Asset market model: views currencies as an important asset class for constructing investment portfolios. Asset prices are influenced mostly by people's willingness to hold the existing quantities of assets, which in turn depends on their expectations on the future worth of these assets. The asset market model of exchange rate determination states that “the exchange rate between two currencies represents the price that just balances the relative supplies of, and demand for, assets denominated in those currencies.”

None of the models developed so far succeed to explain exchange rates and volatility in the longer time frames. For shorter time frames (less than a few days), algorithms can be devised to predict prices. It is understood from the above models that many macroeconomic factors affect the exchange rates and in the end currency prices are a result of dual forces of supply and demand. The world's currency markets can be viewed as a huge melting pot: in a large and ever-changing mix of current events, supply and demand factors are constantly shifting, and the price of one currency in relation to another shifts accordingly. No other market encompasses (and distills) as much of what is going on in the world at any given time as foreign exchange.

Supply and demand for any given currency, and thus its value, are not influenced by any single element, but rather by several. These elements generally fall into three categories: economic factors, political conditions, and market psychology.

=== Economic factors ===
Economic factors include: (a) economic policy, disseminated by government agencies and central banks, (b) economic conditions, generally revealed through economic reports, and other economic indicators.

- Economic policy comprises government fiscal policy (budget/spending practices) and monetary policy (the means by which a government's central bank influences the supply and "cost" of money, which is reflected by the level of interest rates).
- Government budget deficits or surpluses: The market usually reacts negatively to widening government budget deficits, and positively to narrowing budget deficits. The impact is reflected in the value of a country's currency.
- Balance of trade levels and trends: The trade flow between countries illustrates the demand for goods and services, which in turn indicates demand for a country's currency to conduct trade. Surpluses and deficits in trade of goods and services reflect the competitiveness of a nation's economy. For example, trade deficits may have a negative impact on a nation's currency.
- Inflation levels and trends: Typically a currency will lose value if there is a high level of inflation in the country or if inflation levels are perceived to be rising. This is because inflation erodes purchasing power, thus demand, for that particular currency. However, a currency may sometimes strengthen when inflation rises because of expectations that the central bank will raise short-term interest rates to combat rising inflation.
- Economic growth and health: Reports such as GDP, employment levels, retail sales, capacity utilization and others, detail the levels of a country's economic growth and health. Generally, the more healthy and robust a country's economy, the better its currency will perform, and the more demand for it there will be.
- Productivity of an economy: Increasing productivity in an economy should positively influence the value of its currency. Its effects are more prominent if the increase is in the traded sector.

=== Political conditions ===
Internal, regional, and international political conditions and events can have a profound effect on currency markets.

All exchange rates are susceptible to political instability and anticipations about the new ruling party. Political upheaval and instability can have a negative impact on a nation's economy. For example, destabilization of coalition governments in Pakistan and Thailand can negatively affect the value of their currencies. Similarly, in a country experiencing financial difficulties, the rise of a political faction that is perceived to be fiscally responsible can have the opposite effect. Also, events in one country in a region may spur positive/negative interest in a neighboring country and, in the process, affect its currency.

=== Market psychology ===
Market psychology and trader perceptions influence the foreign exchange market in a variety of ways:

- Flights to quality: Unsettling international events can lead to a "flight-to-quality", a type of capital flight whereby investors move their assets to a perceived "safe haven". There will be a greater demand, thus a higher price, for currencies perceived as stronger over their relatively weaker counterparts. The US dollar, Swiss franc and gold have been traditional safe havens during times of political or economic uncertainty.
- Long-term trends: Currency markets often move in visible long-term trends. Although currencies do not have an annual growing season like physical commodities, business cycles do make themselves felt. Cycle analysis looks at longer-term price trends that may rise from economic or political trends.
- "Buy the rumor, sell the fact": This market truism can apply to many currency situations. It is the tendency for the price of a currency to reflect the impact of a particular action before it occurs and, when the anticipated event comes to pass, react in exactly the opposite direction. This may also be referred to as a market being "oversold" or "overbought". To buy the rumor or sell the fact can also be an example of the cognitive bias known as Anchoring, when investors focus too much on the relevance of outside events to currency prices.
- Economic numbers: While economic numbers can certainly reflect economic policy, some reports and numbers take on a talisman-like effect: the number itself becomes important to market psychology and may have an immediate impact on short-term market moves. "What to watch" can change over time. In recent years, for example, money supply, employment, trade balance figures and inflation numbers have all taken turns in the spotlight.
- Technical trading considerations: As in other markets, the accumulated price movements in a currency pair such as EUR/USD can form apparent patterns that traders may attempt to use. Many traders study price charts in order to identify such patterns.

== Financial instruments ==
=== Spot ===
A spot transaction is a two-day delivery transaction (except in the case of trades between the US dollar, Canadian dollar, Turkish lira, euro and Russian ruble, which settle the next business day), as opposed to the futures contracts, which are usually three months. This trade represents a “direct exchange” between two currencies, has the shortest time frame, involves cash rather than a contract, and interest is not included in the agreed-upon transaction. Spot trading is one of the most common types of forex trading. Often, a forex broker will charge a small fee to the client to roll-over the expiring transaction into a new identical transaction for a continuation of the trade. This roll-over fee is known as the "swap" fee.

=== Forward ===
One way to deal with the foreign exchange risk is to engage in a forward transaction. In this transaction, money does not actually change hands until some agreed upon future date. A buyer and seller agree on an exchange rate for any date in the future, and the transaction occurs on that date, regardless of what the market rates are then. The duration of the trade can be one day, a few days, months or years. Usually the date is decided by both parties. Then the forward contract is negotiated and agreed upon by both parties.

=== Non-deliverable forward (NDF) ===
Forex banks, ECNs, and prime brokers offer NDF contracts, which are derivatives that have no real deliver-ability. NDFs are popular for currencies with restrictions such as the Argentinian peso. In fact, a forex hedger can only hedge such risks with NDFs, as currencies such as the Argentinian peso cannot be traded on open markets like major currencies.

=== Swap ===
The most common type of forward transaction is the foreign exchange swap. In a swap, two parties exchange currencies for a certain length of time and agree to reverse the transaction at a later date. These are not standardized contracts and are not traded through an exchange. A deposit is often required in order to hold the position open until the transaction is completed.

=== Futures ===
Futures are standardized forward contracts and are usually traded on an exchange created for this purpose. The average contract length is roughly 3 months. Futures contracts are usually inclusive of any interest amounts.

Currency futures contracts are contracts specifying a standard volume of a particular currency to be exchanged on a specific settlement date. Thus the currency futures contracts are similar to forward contracts in terms of their obligation, but differ from forward contracts in the way they are traded. In addition, Futures are daily settled removing credit risk that exist in Forwards. They are commonly used by MNCs to hedge their currency positions. In addition they are traded by speculators who hope to capitalize on their expectations of exchange rate movements.

=== Option ===
A foreign exchange option (commonly shortened to just FX option) is a derivative where the owner has the right but not the obligation to exchange money denominated in one currency into another currency at a pre-agreed exchange rate on a specified date. The FX options market is the deepest, largest and most liquid market for options of any kind in the world.

== Speculation ==
Controversy about currency speculators and their effect on currency devaluations and national economies recurs regularly. Economists, such as Milton Friedman, have argued that speculators ultimately are a stabilizing influence on the market, and that stabilizing speculation performs the important function of providing a market for hedgers and transferring risk from those people who don't wish to bear it, to those who do. Other economists, such as Joseph Stiglitz, consider this argument to be based more on politics and a free market philosophy than on economics.

Large hedge funds and other well capitalized "position traders" are the main professional speculators. According to some economists, individual traders could act as "noise traders" and have a more destabilizing role than larger and better informed actors.

Currency speculation is considered a highly suspect activity in many countries, such as Thailand. While investment in traditional financial instruments like bonds or stocks often is considered to contribute positively to economic growth by providing capital, currency speculation does not; according to this view, it is simply gambling that often interferes with economic policy. For example, in 1992, currency speculation forced Sweden's central bank, the Riksbank, to raise interest rates for a few days to 500% per annum, and later to devalue the krona. Mahathir Mohamad, one of the former Prime Ministers of Malaysia, is one well-known proponent of this view. He blamed the devaluation of the Malaysian ringgit in 1997 on George Soros and other speculators.

Gregory Millman reports on an opposing view, comparing speculators to "vigilantes" who simply help "enforce" international agreements and anticipate the effects of basic economic "laws" in order to profit. In this view, countries may develop unsustainable economic bubbles or otherwise mishandle their national economies, and foreign exchange speculators made the inevitable collapse happen sooner. A relatively quick collapse might even be preferable to continued economic mishandling, followed by an eventual, larger, collapse. Mahathir Mohamad and other critics of speculation are viewed as trying to deflect the blame from themselves for having caused the unsustainable economic conditions.

== Risk aversion ==
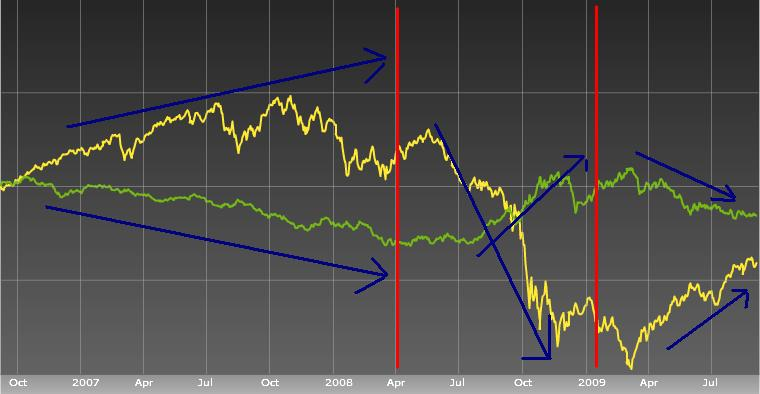
The MSCI World Index of Equities fell while the US dollar index rose.

In order to mitigate risk, traders may liquidate their positions in various currencies to take up positions in safe-haven currencies, such as the US dollar. Sometimes, the choice of a safe haven currency is more of a choice based on prevailing sentiments rather than one of economic statistics. An example would be the 2008 financial crisis, where value of equities across the world fell while the US dollar strengthened (see Fig.1). This happened despite the strong focus of the crisis in the US.

== Carry trade ==
Currency carry trade refers to the act of borrowing one currency that has a low interest rate in order to purchase another with a higher interest rate. A large difference in rates can be highly profitable for the trader, especially if high leverage is used. However, with all levered investments this is a double edged sword, and large exchange rate price fluctuations can suddenly swing trades into huge losses.

== See also ==
- Balance of trade
- Currency codes
- Currency strength
- Dual exchange rate
- Effective exchange rate
- Foreign currency mortgage
- Foreign exchange controls
- Foreign exchange derivative
- Foreign exchange hedge
- Foreign exchange option
- Foreign exchange regulation
- Foreign exchange reserves
- Foreign exchange risk
- Leads and lags
- List of circulating currencies
- List of countries by exchange rate regime
- List of electronic trading platforms
- Money market
- Nonfarm payrolls
- Tobin tax
- World currency
