= Dual exchange rate =

In economics, a dual exchange rate is the occurrence of two different values of a currency for different sets of monetary transactions. One of the most common types consists of a government setting one exchange rate for specific transactions involving foreign exchange and another exchange rate governing other transactions.

A dual exchange rate policy can arise for a variety of reasons. In the past, European and Latin American countries have used dual exchange rates to ease the transition from a fixed rate to a floating rate. Dual exchange rates are similar to multiple exchange rates in that they can appear when there is simultaneously both an official and black market rate.

== History ==
In the gold standard and the Bretton Woods system, the major developed countries mainly implemented fixed exchange rate systems. Due to the devaluation of the pound around the 1970s and the collapse of the Bretton Woods system, many developed countries switched to floating exchange rates. In 1971, France started to adopt the dual exchange rate system. After that, in 1973, Italy also adopted this system. Both countries maintained these dual exchange rate systems through the early 1970s. The Belgium–Luxembourg Economic Union has been using this system since 1957.

Around the same time (i.e. the 1970s), many Latin American countries also shifted from a single exchange rate system to a dual exchange rate system or a multiple exchange rate system. With the structural adjustment to international trade that has occurred since the mid-1980s, especially the deepening of trade reform, Latin American countries have begun gradually abandoning multiple exchange rate systems, favoring instead the implementation of single exchange rate systems.

From 1981 to 1985, during a period of reform and opening up, China formally implemented a dual exchange rate system. After 1985, China appeared in the foreign exchange market and the official exchange rate coexisted with a market-determined exchange rate. This system, though, didn't last long and was abandoned in 1994.

From 1985 to 1995, South Africa also implemented a dual exchange rate system, and achieved remarkable results.

== Advantages ==
The advantages of dual exchange systems are tied primarily to their ability to prevent capital movements from affecting the current account and the exchange rate for current transactions by separating the exchange market for capital transactions and the exchange market for current transactions. Dual exchange systems are oftentimes used as a short-term alternative to placing quantitative controls on capital movements, especially in cases where a country may be transitioning between exchange rate types.

=== Inflation ===
Dual exchange rates are oftentimes used to stabilize currency values when countries face financial crises. Because most modern financial crises are preceded by substantial inflows and outflows of short to medium-term loans (which create financial instability), countries may implement dual exchange markets in order to discourage undesirable capital imports. Dual exchange rates are able to discourage these undesirable imports while maintaining desirable capital imports and allowing the exchange rate of the current account market to remain independent of the exchange rate of the capital account market, thereby preventing substantial negative effects on the current account. This separation will prevent the current account exchange rate from devaluing or overvaluing a country’s exports and may prevent inflation that would otherwise take place due to the inflows of undesirable capital imports.

=== Government revenue ===
Countries implementing dual exchange systems may merely separate the exchange rates for the current and capital account markets, or they may set controls on one or the other; the latter option being intended to raise revenue for the government. Countries implementing such systems typically put any exchange controls on the market for financing current transactions. However, economists such as Raymond Mikesell have argued against use of exchange controls in dual exchange systems except those necessary to maintain the separation of the markets.

== Disadvantages ==
In times of economic collapse, countries may choose to implement a dual exchange rate. This policy change can be seen as an efficient way to alleviate short-run economic hardship. However, dual exchange rate policies have several long-run economic problems.

The primary issue that may arise within an economy operating under a dual exchange rate is misallocation of resources because dual exchange rate will reduce some industry’s favorable exchange rate and those industry will not necessarily reflect its actual need because its performance have been unnaturally inflated. Continual misallocation of resources will eventually cause economic distortion.

A dual exchange rate economy suffering from distortion will incur disparity between the financial exchange rate and the commercial exchange rate. Such an event can lead to the emergence of black markets and arbitrage from individuals seeking to make capital gains. Usage of a dual-exchange system in the long-run will cause inflation. The different exchange rates make it possible for a government to incur a loss in foreign currency transactions, resulting in the central bank printing more money to fix the loss. Over the long-run, this will result in significant inflation. If there is no government intervention these issues will persist and create serious economic distortion behavior.
