= Access to finance =

Access to finance is the ability of individuals or enterprises to obtain financial services, including credit, deposit, payment, insurance, and other risk management services. Those who involuntarily have no or only limited access to financial services are referred to as the unbanked or underbanked, respectively. Areas with inadequate banking services are referred to as banking deserts.

Accumulated evidence has shown that financial access promotes growth for enterprises through the provision of credit to both new and existing businesses. It benefits the economy in general by accelerating economic growth, intensifying competition, as well as boosting demand for labor. The incomes of those in the lower end of the income ladder will typically rise hence reducing income inequality and poverty.

The lack of financial access limits the range of services and credits for household and enterprises. Poor individuals and small enterprises need to rely on their personal wealth or internal resources to invest in their education and businesses, which limits their full potential and leading to the cycle of persistent inequality and diminished growth.

Access to finance varies greatly between countries and ranges from about 5 percent of the adult population in Papua New Guinea and Tanzania to 100 percent in the Netherlands

== Defining and measuring access to financial services ==
Access to finance (the possibility that individuals or enterprises can access financial services) should be distinguished from the actual use of financial services, because non-use of finance can be voluntary or involuntary. Voluntary non-users of financial services have access to but do not use financial services either because they have no need for those services or because they decided not to make use of such services due to cultural, religious, or other reasons.

Measuring financial access is essential for strengthening the link between theory and empirical evidence. Currently, the main proxy variables that measure financial access include: the number of bank accounts per 1,000 adults, number of bank branches per 100,000 adults, the percentage of firms with line of credit (large and small firms).

In the case of financial markets, measuring financial access requires ascertaining market concentration, for a high degree of concentration reflects greater difficulties for entry of newer and smaller firms. Other factors include the percentage of market capitalization and traded value outside of top 10 largest companies, government bond yields (3 month and 10 years), ratio of private to total debt securities (domestic), ratio of domestic to total debt securities, and the ratio of new corporate bond issues to GDP.

Involuntary non-users want to use financial services, but do not have access due to a variety of reasons: First, they may be unbankable because their low income prevents them from being served commercially (i.e. profitably) by financial institutions; second, they may be discriminated against based on social, religious, or ethnic grounds; third, they may be unbankable because contractual and informational networks (such as high collateral requirements or a lack of information from credit registries) prevent financial institutions from commercially serving these non-users; finally, the price or features of financial services may not be appropriate for the population groups of the non-users.

Because the factors that determine whether or not an individual or enterprise has access to finance may change over time, it makes sense to group the banked and unbanked into market segments that reflect their current and possible future status as users or non-users of financial services. One such approach to market segmentation is the "access frontier", which can be used for analyzing the development of markets over time. The access frontier defines the maximum proportion of the population that has access to a product or service at a given point in time, and the frontier may shift over time, e.g. as the result of technological and competitive changes in the market. The access frontier approach distinguishes between users and non-users of a product or service, and segments non-users into four groups:

- Those who are able to use the product or service but choose not to (voluntary non-users)
- Those who can currently access the product or service but do not yet (non-users, lying within the present access frontier)
- Those who should be able to use the product or service within the next three to five years, based on changes in the features of the product or service, or of the market, respectively (non-users, lying within the future access frontier)
- Those beyond the reach of market solutions in the next three to five years (the supra-market group, lying beyond the future access frontier)

The following table gives an overview of the grouping of consumers into users and non-users, the segmentation of non-users, as well as three zones that enable government policies to better match interventions to the requirements of market development.

User group	Market segment	Market policy zone
Users	Current users (current market)	n/a
Non-users	Voluntary non-users	n/a
Non-users	Non-users, lying within the present access frontier	Market enablement zone
Non-users	Non-users, lying within the future access frontier	Market development zone
Non-users	The supra-market group, lying beyond the future access frontier	Market redistribution zone

Estimating and measuring access to finance is relatively difficult because relevant data are not readily available. A lack of consistent cross-country data on the use of financial services has led to the use of the number of deposit and loan accounts as a simple measure of financial access, although this is an imperfect measure of financial access.

== Formal and informal financial services ==
Financial services may be provided by a variety of financial intermediaries that are part of the financial system. A distinction is made between formal and informal providers of financial services, which is based primarily on whether there is a legal infrastructure that provides recourse to lenders and protection to depositors. The following table gives an overview of this distinction by showing the segments of financial systems by degree of formality.

Tier	Definition	Institutions	Principal clients
Formal banks	Licensed by central bank	Commercial & development banks	Large businesses Government
Specialized non-bank financial institutions (NBFIs)	Licensed by central bank	Rural banks Post Bank; Savings & loan companies Deposit-taking microfinance banks	Large rural enterprises Salaried workers Small & medium enterprises
Semi-formal	Legally registered, but not licensed as financial institution by central bank	Credit unions Microfinance NGOs	Microenterprises; Entrepreneurial poor
Informal	Not legally registered at national level (though may belong to a registered association)	Savings (susu) collectors Savings & credit associations, susu groups Moneylenders	Self-employed; Poor

A more detailed approach to distinguishing formal and informal financial services adds semi-formal services as a third segment to the above. While formal financial services are provided by financial institutions chartered by the government and subject to banking regulations and supervision, semi-formal financial services are not regulated by banking authorities but are usually licensed and supervised by other government agencies. Informal financial services are provided outside the structure of government regulation and supervision.

== Barriers and Policies to Increase Access ==
However, in many countries financial access is still limited to only 20–50 percent of the population, excluding many poor individuals and SMEs. Many reasons could explain the limited financial access especially among the poor. First, the poor lack the education and knowledge needed to understand financial services that are available to them. Second, loan officers might find it unprofitable to serve the small credit needs and transaction volume of the lower-income population. Additionally, banks may not be geographically accessible for the poor since financial institutions are likely to be located in richer neighborhoods. The poor are also burdened by lack of collateral and inability to borrow against their future income because their income streams tend to be hard to track and predict.

In light of the lack of financial access for the poor, over the past few decades developments in micro finance institutions have managed to provide financial services to some of the world's poorest, and achieved good repayments.

There are still work to be done to build inclusive financial systems. This includes taking advantage of the technological advances in developing financial infrastructure to lower transaction costs, encouraging transparency, openness and competition to incentivize current institutions to expand service coverage, and enforcing prudential regulations in order to provide the private sector with the right incentives.

== See also ==
- List of countries by share of population with access to financial services
- Microfinance
- WIZZIT
