= Travelex =

Foreign exchange company

Travelex International Limited
- Type: Private
- Industry: Financial services
- Founded: 1976; 50 years ago
- Founder: Lloyd Dorfman
- Headquarters: Peterborough; United Kingdom
- Key people: Philip Bowcock (CEO)
- Products: Foreign exchange
- Revenue: £553.3m (2024)
- Website: travelex-corporate.com

Travelex International Limited is a foreign exchange company founded by Lloyd Dorfman and headquartered in Peterborough, United Kingdom. Its main businesses are foreign currency exchange, issuing prepaid credit cards for use by travellers, supplying central banks with foreign currency and global remittance. Travelex operates more than 600 stores and 700 ATMs in over 20 countries.

== History ==
Travelex was founded as Express Exchange by Dorfman and opened its first branch in central London in 1976. By 1978 the company had four central London stores.

The company experienced growth in the 1980s, opening its first international store in 1984 in Rotterdam, and its first store at Heathrow Terminal 4 in 1986. Express Exchange subsequently became Travellers Exchange Corporation — or Travelex — when abbreviated.

Travelex expanded throughout the US and into the APAC region in the 1990s. The company also undertook a series of investments, acquisitions and takeovers during this period, including a takeover of Abbey National's retail forex operation, receiving investment from 3i and the acquisition of Transpay.

On 8 November 2000, it bought Thomas Cook's worldwide foreign exchange business for £440m, which significantly expanded its international operations. Travelex also launched their first stores in the Indian, Chinese and Middle Eastern markets, undertook further acquisitions and launched a new brand identity during the 2000s.

In February 2005, buy-out firm Apax Partners bought a majority stake in the company, but Dorfman retained 30% and continued to run the business.

In 2011 Travelex sold its prepaid card programme management business to MasterCard and its international payments business to Western Union for a combined £900m. In 2011, Travelex also purchased Grupo Confidence, Brazil's largest independent foreign exchange business.

By March 2014, Travelex had more than 1,500 stores and 1,250 ATMs in 27 countries.

In 2014, Apax Partners sold its majority stake of 51% to UAE-based Indian businessman B. R. Shetty valuing the company at approx £1bn. Shetty also owned UAE Exchange, a UAE-based money transfer business. The acquisition was supported by Abu Dhabi-based investment vehicle Centurion and completed in January 2015.

In May 2019, Travelex, UAE Exchange and a number of other financial service businesses operated by B. R. Shetty were placed into a holding company called Finablr, prior to an IPO on the London Stock Exchange that took place on 15 May that year.

In October 2019 Travelex announced the launch of a US-based international payments system in partnership with Finablr and Samsung Pay.

In 2020 the company faced difficulties including a cyber incident, the impact of the Covid-19 pandemic and issues relating to Travelex's parent company, Finablr. Later that year Travelex fell into administration, before it was taken over by its debt holders. As a result of the takeover, the business was restructured and became "New Travelex."

=== 2019 - 2020 cyberattack ===
On 31 December 2019, Travelex took its UK and international websites and mobile apps offline following a reported cyberattack an action that also affected a number of large corporate third parties to whom Travelex provided a white-labelled travel money service including the online travel money services of supermarket chains such as ASDA, Tesco and Sainsbury's, of which Travelex serves as the provider of these services using the supermarkets' branding.

On 7 January 2020, Travelex shut down all of its websites after it was announced that the company was being held to ransom by hackers. The cyber criminals demanded £4.6 million ($6 million) in ransom from Travelex after infecting its network with Sodinokibi ransomware and claiming to have copied more than 5GB of customer personal data. The hackers demanded payment in exchange for either restoration of IT systems or the preservation of customer data, and it was understood that a deadline of seven days payment was set by the cyber criminals.

On 13 January 2020, the company announced there had been no evidence of customer data being copied, and the company issued a formal statement on services being resumed. The company also stated that the business had continued to trade throughout January, with in-store services and ATMs available.

On 16 January 2020, the company announced that it had managed to restore the automated order placement used by several UK high street banks and that it would relaunch its international money transfer service by the end of the month. On 17 January 2020, boss Tony D'Souza said, in a video message on a back-up website, that the IT system used by in-store staff was working again.

It was reported that Travelex ended up paying the cyber criminals $2.3 million.

=== 2020 administration, restructuring and new ownership ===
On 26 May 2020, Travelex announced a wave of redundancies citing the COVID-19 pandemic.

On 15 June 2020, Travelex announced that it had terminated its attempt to sell itself, the action having been originally announced by the business on 13 May 2020.

On 30 June 2020, on the day they had been due, Travelex announced that it would be delaying the publication of its FY 2019 accounts. The business stated that its delayed completion of financial statements was owing to the cyber incident and implications of COVID-19.

On 1 July 2020, Travelex ceased its international money transfer services in the UK and abroad, which had formerly been branded 'Travelex Wire'.

On 6 August 2020, the business entered administration with PwC being appointed to multiple subsidiaries within the business that day.

PwC later announced that Travelex had completed a debt restructuring. The deal provided £84m of new funding, reduced the business's debt and safeguarded 1,802 UK jobs and a further 3,635 globally. The deal also resulted in the majority of its UK store estate closing with immediate effect and 1,309 UK redundancies. As a result of the deal, Travelex was no longer a Finablr subsidiary, with the company now under the ownership of its debt holders.

The acquiring of Travelex by its creditors went on to split the remaining business into two parts; OldCo and NewCo, together "New Travelex". It confirmed its intention to actively continue a number of components within the group including Africa, Asia, ATMs, Brazil, Middle East, outsourcing and wholesale; but also to place under review (and retain in administration) other formerly-core areas of the remaining business including but not limited to its business in North America, as well as European stores and UK stores.

=== New Travelex growth ===
In November 2021 Travelex Middle East announced plans to expand its store portfolio, with new stores set to open in Bahrain, Sharjah, Dubai and Abu Dhabi. The expansion was announced in light of major regional events, such as Expo 2020 and the 2022 FIFA World Cup, driving a return to travel following the Covid-19 pandemic. That month the company also announced two new concept stores at Amsterdam Airport Schiphol.

In January 2022 Travelex announced it had launched a full range of services at London Stansted.

In April 2022 Travelex announced the appointment of Richard Wazacz as new CEO.

In June 2022 Travelex announced the creation of more than 1,200 new jobs worldwide, including 1,000 jobs in the UK, 100 across Australia and New Zealand, 60 in Europe and 50 across Asia. The company also stated it had created and filled 150 new jobs in Brazil and 180 new jobs across the Middle East in the six months prior.

Travelex also announced new contract wins and store openings across its international markets throughout the year, including a first-of-its-kind “digital store” in Adelaide. In late 2022 Travelex launched the retail FX industry’s first ATM click-and-collect service at London Heathrow and Brisbane airports. In November 2022 Travelex announced a steep rise in revenues, with its Q3 revenues up 160% compared to 2021.

In 2023 New Travelex maintained an upward growth trajectory as international travel continued to rebound, including an aggressive expansion of its international store footprint.

In January the company announced a global staff pay rise, followed by the launch of new stores and the extension of key contracts across Australia and New Zealand, taking Travelex’s footprint to 100 stores across ANZ. In May Travelex announced the opening of a further 20 bureaux across its international markets.

By November, Travelex had launched a further 75 bureaux, kiosks and ATMs across airports, cruise terminals and railway stations across the UK Europe, APAC, South America and the Middle East. This included Travelex’s first UK rail store at London Paddington and a new automated kiosk at London Heathrow.

In Japan, Travelex celebrated 20 years of operations and launched its pre-paid Travel Money Card into the market in September. The company also announced ambitions to increase its Japan bureaux footprint by 40% to 100 stores by the end of 2024.

Travelex also launched and expanded a number of products and partnerships throughout 2023, including a new UK retail exchange product, an affiliate referral programme with Bank of New Zealand and the trading of Cambodian Khmer Rhiel at Changi airport. The company also expanded its ATM click-and-collect service across Heathrow, Birmingham and Manchester airports.

In September 2023 Travelex announced it had successfully completed a £90m refinancing deal.

In early 2024 Travelex reported strong revenues with its full year financial results, with EBITDA and revenues up 156% and 24% year-on-year respectively.

In H1 2024 Travelex announced the launch of new bureaux and ATM locations, including at London Westfield and Zayed International Airport, and the winning of a tender to operate at Munich Airport from 2026. In Asia, Travelex launched both its click-and-collect service in Hong Kong, and a series of bank partnerships across Japan.

In H2 Travelex announced further contract wins, including a new five-year agreement with Changi Airport and an extended contract at Perth Airport.[JB1] Travelex also announced a major investment into the UAE with the launch of a further 13 stores at Abu Dhabi and Dubai airports, as well as the launch of a home delivery pilot in the Netherlands and a refresh of all 600 ATMs across the company’s estate.

2024 also saw Travelex add seven additional currencies to its pre-paid Travel Money Card (TMC) as well as the launch of its new app.

== Services ==
Travelex operates a wide range of foreign currency-based services, including:

- Retail stores: Travelex operates over 600 bureaux de change retail stores worldwide offering a wide range of foreign exchange services. In 2021 Travelex launched two new concept stores at Amsterdam Airport Schiphol.
- ATMs: Travelex operates over 700 Travelex branded ATMs worldwide.
- Online and mobile home delivery and click and collect: A facility enabling customers to order cash or pre-paid cards through Travelex’s website or mobile app for home delivery or collection in store.
- Remittance: Remittance services in the Middle East, providing retail customers with money transfers.
- Prepaid cards: Multi-currency prepaid cards operated in partnership with MasterCard.
- Outsourcing/white labelled products: Travelex provides foreign currency services to a range of partners, including supermarkets and retail banks such as Tesco, Sainsbury’s and ASDA.
- Wholesale banknotes: Travelex provides wholesale supply of banknotes to hundreds of financial institutions and Central Banks worldwide.

As of May 2025, the company has 39 international subsidiaries.

== Sponsorships ==
Travelex sponsored the National Theatre's discounted ticket scheme between 2003 and 2018. In 2010 Lloyd Dorfman gave the theatre £10m, its biggest ever donation. Following redevelopment in 2013, the Cottesloe Theatre was renamed the Dorfman Theatre.

Travelex sponsored the Australia men's national cricket team – initially for its 2001 tour of England and Ireland and later for all its overseas tours between 2002 and 2010. Travelex also sponsored ITV's coverage of the 2002 FIFA World Cup and 2003 Rugby World Cup, as well as the Panasonic Toyota Racing team between 2002 and 2003. In 2005 Travelex announced Jonny Wilkinson as a brand ambassador.

In September 2021 Travelex Australia and New Zealand announced the 'Athlete Alliance', an initiative to support Australian and New Zealand winter athletes with finances, mentoring and education in the runup to the 2022 Winter Olympics and 2022 Winter Paralympics. Athletes involves in the initiative include Sami Kennedy-Sim, Jonty O'Callaghan and Campbell Wright.
