= Wizzit =

South African banking services provider

WIZZIT International
- Company type: Private
- Industry: Finance
- Founded: 2004
- Headquarters: Sandton, South Africa
- Key people: Brian Richardson (Co-founder and Managing Director), Charles Rowlinson (Co-founder and Chairman)
- Services: Financial services
- Owner: Management; IFC; NACTU; Private investors
- Number of employees: >2,000 (2008)

Wizzit is a provider of basic banking services for the unbanked and underbanked (people or enterprises that have no or only limited access to banking services) in South Africa. Its services are based on the use of mobile phones for accessing bank accounts and conducting transactions, in addition to a Maestro debit card that is issued to all customers upon registration. Wizzit is a branchless banking business, meaning that its services are designed so that customers can generally conduct transactions without the need to visit bank branches.

== History ==
Launched in 2004, Wizzit is formally a division of the South African Bank of Athens but its brand is owned and its operations are run by a group of independent entrepreneurs. Wizzit had an estimated 250,000 customers in South Africa at the end of 2008 and has launched pilot projects in Zambia and Romania, where it intends to expand. It had earlier reported that it expected to expand into other African countries as well and that it had been approached by potential partners from Kenya, Botswana, Namibia, Zambia, and Malawi.

== Financial infrastructure ==
While Wizzit does not operate any branches on its own, it has partnered with the Absa Group and the South African Post Office that act as banking agents and allow Wizzit's customers to deposit funds at any Absa or Post Office branch. Similarly, Wizzit does not have an automated teller machine (ATM) network but its customers can pay for purchases and withdraw funds using their debit card at any point of sale (POS) or ATM accepting Maestro cards. Wizzit has also partnered with Dunns, a fashion retailer focusing on lower to middle-income customer segments that acts as an agent for opening accounts

== Recruitment ==
The company maintains a policy of only recruiting unemployed people, which it has integrated into its promotion strategy: Because marketing costs represent one of the biggest financial challenges to its business, Wizzit does not use mass media advertisements but relies instead on so-called WIZZkids—previously unemployed individuals that the company certifies to become sales agents. Besides the commission on sales, WIZZkids receive annuity income based on the transaction level of account holders, which motivates them to train customers to use their accounts. The WIZZkids are typically young, low-income individuals living in the communities from which they recruit their customers.

== Expansion plans ==
Wizzit aims at partnering with either existing banks or microfinance institutions (MFIs) in the countries it intends to expand to, a strategy it has been testing with Beehive, a South African MFI. Wizzit has also been planning to acquire merchants as agents in South Africa's rural areas, where the majority of its potential customers reside and where there is only an underdeveloped payments infrastructure available, such as ATMs and POS devices. If successful, merchants will offer customers the ability to deposit money to and withdraw money from their Wizzit bank accounts, as well as to pay for purchases by using their mobile phones.
