= Finablr =

Abu Dhabi-headquartered financial services company

- Company type: Limited company
- Industry: Financial services
- Founded: April 2018; 8 years ago
- Headquarters: Abu Dhabi
- Products: Payment Technology; Foreign Exchange; Cross-Border Payments
- Revenue: $1,434.6 mil* (2018)
- Operating income: $164.8 mil* (2018)
- Net income: $-13.3 mil* (2018)
- Number of employees: 18,201 (2018)
- Subsidiaries: UAE Exchange; Xpress Money; TimesofMoney; Remit2India; Bayan Pay; Travelex; Unimoni; PEaaS; Swych; Nyuvo; Ditto
- Website: www.finablr.com
- Footnotes / references * Figures as declared in 2018

Finablr was a financial services holding company that operated between 2018 and 2020. It was listed on the London Stock Exchange, but its shares were suspended and subsequently delisted from trading in 2020 after a financial scandal.

== History ==
=== Foundation and IPO ===
The company was established by the Indian-born former billionaire B. R. Shetty in April 2018. Initial investments included UAE Exchange, which Shetty acquired in 1980, and Travelex, which was acquired in 2014.

In October 2018, Finablr brands, Travelex and Swych, launched a cross-border shopping solution for WeChat Pay users.

In November 2018, Finablr acquired India's digital payments firm TimesofMoney from Network International to capitalise on the growth of e-commerce. Also in November 2018, Finablr became a majority shareholder of Swych, a digital gifting platform.

The company was the subject of an initial public offering on the London Stock Exchange in May 2019.

=== Start of financial problems ===
In January 2020, it was disclosed that shares representing 56% of the company had been pledged by BRS Ventures & Holdings, a company controlled by Dr BR Shetty, as collateral for borrowings.

In February 2020, it was announced by Ditto Bank, a wholly owned subsidiary of the business, that their consumer-facing (B2C) operation would cease over the following few months as part of 'a strategic pivot to Banking as a Service'.

Throughout February and March 2020 shares in the business fell more than 90% compared with their value at 31 December 2019. This followed a considerably turbulent time for the business following the Travelex cyberattack that took place on New Year's Eve 2019, and directly affected its services across the globe for around six weeks, with the financial impact of this currently estimated in the region of circa £25 million on a like-for-like basis. The business's share price had also been impacted by the founder, co-chairman and primary shareholder B. R. Shetty's links to the troubled NMC Health business, of which he is also a founder and co-chairman, combined with the headwinds dealt by the ongoing spread of the coronavirus. The business said:

"The outbreak of Covid-19 is an incremental negative for Travelex's business given broad exposure to airports and travel flows. VAT and related services will also be negatively impacted. While China and other Asian in-country revenue account for approximately 10% of Travelex revenues, other markets closely linked to Asian outbound travel are also experiencing headwinds."

On 12 March 2020, the business announced that it was taking steps to assess accurately its current liquidity and cashflow position, with shares trading at circa 7 pence, down 97% from 11 December 2019 when their value peaked at 215 pence.

=== Stock market listing suspended ===
On 16 March 2020, the business's listing on the London Stock Exchange was suspended as it was announced that it was in danger of collapse having identified circa US$100m (£81m) of undisclosed financing, which meant it no longer had any certainty over its financial position. Simultaneously, Promoth Manghat, Group CEO, left the business. The business also stated that it was no longer able to provide certain payment processing services; however it failed to address which services this entailed. Kroll were appointed to carry out an independent investigation into its finances.

On 17 March 2020, the business announced that it had engaged an accountancy firm to undertake rapid contingency planning for a potential insolvency appointment.

On 18 March 2020, the business announced that its UAE Exchange division would be supervised by the Central Bank of the UAE with immediate effect. The Central Bank of the UAE also stated that it had commenced an examination of UAE Exchange in order to verify its compliance with applicable laws and regulations.

On 29 March 2020, EY (Ernst & Young LLP) resigned as auditor of the business.

On 9 April 2020, it was reported that Travelex had paid a ransom fee of US$2.3 million to restore their systems.

On 9 April 2020, shares in the business were suspended from the London Stock Exchange. The business announced the resignation of Promoth Manghat as chief executive with immediate effect the same day, as well as the appointments of Kroll and Houlihan Lokey to carry out an independent investigation into its finances. Among other localised authorities the UK's Financial Conduct Authority and the Central Bank of the United Arab Emirates are also investigating the business's finances.

On 22 April 2020, the Travelex division announced that it had placed itself up for sale with immediate effect and was working with PwC on the sale process, it stated that the division had "communicated this intention to Finablr".

During April 2020, the operations of most of the business's fascias were suspended in their entirety. UAE Exchange, Xpress Money, TimesofMoney, Remit2India, Unimoni and Ditto (which had ceased previously) all displayed suspension notices on their corporate website homepages

"[division name] is temporarily unavailable for undertaking transactions. We regret the inconvenience and thank you for your understanding and cooperation as we endeavour to restore the service"

=== Undeclared debts ===
On 30 April 2020, Finablr announced previously undeclared debts of around US$1.3 billion had been identified by Houlihan Lokey and Kroll as part of their investigations, and that it "cannot exclude the possibility that some of the proceeds of these borrowings may have been used for purposes outside of the Finablr Group".

During June 2020, Xpress Money, a Finablr business, had its authorisation to operate withdrawn by the UK's Financial Conduct Authority.

In July 2020, Finablr appointed Skadden Arps Slate Meagher & Flom (UK) LLP 'to enable Finablr to investigate historic potential malfeasance within the Finablr Group and any misappropriation of assets of Finablr PLC and certain members of its group'.

On 6 August 2020 PwC announced that a so-called "pre-pack" administration deal for Travelex had been reached, with the company being taken over by a consortium of its creditors.

=== Sale of subsidiaries, administration, delisting and liquidation ===
Efforts to find a buyer for the rest of the Finablr group continued culminating in an agreement to sell Finablr Ltd, the main subsidiary of Finablr plc, together with all subsidiaries to Global Fintech Investments Holding AG (GFIH), a consortium of Prism Group AG and Abu Dhabi's Royal Strategic Partners, in December 2020.

As completion of the acquisition of Finablr Ltd required all regulatory change of control approvals within the whole group, the acquisition of individual operating subsidiaries proceeded as change of control approvals were received. In the meantime, administrators were appointed at Finablr plc in March 2022 and a new sale agreement was agreed with GFIH pursuant to which further subsidiaries were transferred and in March 2024 Finablr plc entered into liquidation.

Due to regulatory and other complications relating to group debts certain subsidiaries of Finablr plc such as UAE Exchange Center LLC (which remained under the administration of the Central Bank of the UAE) and the United Kingdom Xpress Money entity (which entered into administration and was dissolved in November 2025) were not transferred and remained part of the Finablr group.

== Banking licence ==
Finablr had a European Banking licence through the French division of Travelex.

== Major shareholders ==
At the date of the initial public offering, Dr Bavaguthu Raghuram Shetty owned 64.2% of the shares and Mr Binay Shetty owned 3% of the shares. Other major shareholders included UX Investment Holdings Limited (6.8%), Brokerage House Securities (4.9%) and Tejera Capital (3.8%). In January 2020, UX Investment Holdings sold 6% of the share capital and agreed a 90-day lock-up for the remaining shares.

== See also ==
- Emaar Group
- Majid Al Futtaim Group
- Hayel Saeed Anam Group
- Al Tayer Group
