= GK Investment =

Private equity and investment firm

GK Investment Holding Group SA
- Type: Private
- Industry: Alternative Investment
- Founded: 2015; 11 years ago
- Founders: Kamel Ghribi
- Headquarters: Lugano, Switzerland
- Area served: Africa, Europe, and Asia
- Key people: Stefano Dedola; Francesco Sorrentino; Gavino Arrica
- Website: www.gkinvest.com/en

GK Investment Holding Group SA is a Lugano-based private equity and investment firm whose primary focus is in the healthcare Real Estate, Private Equity and Consultancy sector. The principal areas of investment interest are in Africa, Europe, and Asia.

== History ==
The firm was founded in 2015 by Tunisian businessman Kamel Ghribi. It initially started as a trade facilitating company dealing with the export of commodities such as crude oil, condensate, cotton, phosphates, and coffee from the Middle East and Africa regions for private and public sector clients. The company undertook strategic consultancy mandates to establish industrial projects in high growth markets.

== Investments ==
Gruppo Ospedaliero San Donato (GSD Healthcare) - private hospital group in Italy with 44 hospitals and clinics. GK Investment Holding Chairman Kamel Ghribi is Vice President of GSD Healthcare in Italy and Chairman of GSD Middle East. GSD is currently the largest private healthcare group in Italy with estimated revenues of over €1.7 billion.

=== NMC Health Bidding ===
In February 2020, the company confirmed that it will submit a potential bid to acquire UAE-based, $2 billion debt-ridden healthcare company NMC Health. The founder of the NMC Health, B. R. Shetty stepped down from the board due to inaccurate reporting of his holdings.

However, within a month, by March 2020, the company reiterated its stand on investing in NMC Health. It issued a statement that included an offer of only operational support to NMC Health assisting the latter in its continued delivery of healthcare services in Europe, Middle East and Asia.

== Philanthropy ==
- Funding a cardio-vascular department at the Chain of Hope Pediatric Cardiac Center at the Dakar Fann University, Senegal.
- Construction of the National Institute for Cardiovascular Disease in Ibadan, Nigeria.
- Philanthropic sponsorship of numerous foundations, events, gala evenings, and fundraising for a myriad of non-profit organizations such as the CCA, Global Health Pioneer Awards, Middle East Mediterranean Summit, Gulf Africa Decision Makers Forum, and Italian Arab Business Forum.
