= Knightsbridge Foreign Exchange =

New Zealand fintech company

- Industry: Foreign exchange
- Founded: 2009
- Headquarters: Toronto, Ontario, Canada
- Key people: Rahim Madhavji
- Services: Currency Exchange Services
- Website: www.knightsbridgefx.com

Knightsbridge Foreign Exchange or Knightsbridge FX is a Canadian foreign exchange company in Toronto, Ontario that provides extensive currency exchange services to customers across Canada. Since 2009, the company has processed more than CAD $2 billion in foreign exchange transactions across Canada.

== History ==
Founded in 2009 [4], Knightsbridge Foreign Exchange is led by Rahim Madhavji, its co-founder. Prior to founding Knightsbridge FX, Mr. Madhavji worked for TorQuest Partners, where he leveraged buyouts, expansion capital investments, and existing portfolio company investments. Mr. Madhavji has been involved in a number of advisory assignments and he is a frequent guest of different financial shows such as BNN and CTV News.

Rahim gained viral attention in 2015 when he authored a blog post about quitting his job at TorQuest Partners to found Knightsbridge FX.

=== Notable Appearances ===
On March 7, 2019, Rahim Madhavji appeared on season 13, episode 20 of the Canadian Broadcasting Corporation’s Dragons’ Den reality television show, in which he made a CAD 1 million-dollar deal with Arlene Dickinson and Michele Romanow for a 30 percent stake in his company. In 2013 and 2014, PROFIT Magazine recognized Knightsbridge Foreign Exchange in its 14th annual PROFIT HOT 50 as a fast-growing company with year-on-year revenue growth of 564 percent. Additionally, Knightsbridge Foreign Exchange was recognized by PROFIT 500 among Canada's Top-Growing Companies in 2017 and GROWTH 500 in 2018. Knightsbridge Foreign Exchange also ranked #68 among Canada's Top Growing companies in 2019, according to the Globe and Mail. In addition, Knightsbridge Foreign Exchange has also ranked in Canada's Top Growing companies again in 2021 and 2022.

In April 2020, Financial Times recognized Knightsbridge Foreign Exchange as one of the fastest-growing companies in North America.

== Transfer Process ==
For personal currency exchange, Knightsbridge Foreign Exchange requires users to send money to them via online banking or bank transfer. The company then converts the customer's funds and sends it to the client's bank account, or an international account in the case of client-to-client

== Operations ==
Knightsbridge Foreign Exchange offers currency exchange services in North America, with a guarantee of rates lower than those at traditionally financial institutions. The company is registered and regulated by FINTRAC, a Canadian government agency. In Quebec, Knightsbridge is registered and regulated by the Autorité des marchés financiers (AMF) in Quebec. Knightsbridge FX primarily exchanges a number of currencies for clients in North America. Knightsbridge Foreign Exchange's primary banking partner is Bank of Montreal (BMO).

The company is headquartered in First Canadian Place, a skyscraper in Toronto's Financial District. The building additionally houses the global headquarters of the Bank of Montreal.

=== Business Model ===
Knightsbridge FX claims to offer currency conversion rates lower than traditional financial institutions. While banks typically charge 2 percent to 3 percent for currency conversion, Knightsbridge Foreign Exchange advertises rates of half a percent.
