= Al Zahra Hospital =

Al Zahra Hospital Sharjah كوزميسرج - مستشفى الزهراء الشارقة
- NMC Health

Geography
- Location: Al Zahra Street, Sharjah, GCC, United Arab Emirates
- Coordinates: 25.360573°N 55.394130°E

Organisation
- Type: General

Services
- Beds: 137

History
- Opened: 1981

Links
- Lists: Hospitals in United Arab Emirates

Al Zahra Hospital, Sharjah, (renamed NMC Royal Hospital Sharjah in March 2021) is a private general hospital in Sharjah, United Arab Emirates (UAE). Al Zahra serves some 400,000 outpatients and 23,000 inpatients annually, with a capacity of 137 beds.

Facilities at the hospital include a nine-bed Intensive Care Unit, a 14-bed long-term care and rehabilitation unit, seven operating theatres, and a number of specialised units.

== History ==
Established in 1981, the hospital was one of the first and largest such facilities in the UAE. The building was originally intended to be a hotel, and construction started in March 1975, but was repurposed in 1978, when the building's owner instructed Mumbai-based architects Karani and Sanghoi Associates to redevelop it into a hospital. The adjacent Concord Cinema was developed at the same time.

The hospital was acquired in March 2017 by Abu Dhabi-based NMC Healthcare for $560 million from its previous owner, Gulf Medical Projects Company, which continues to own and operate Al Zahra Hospital, Dubai. Al Zahra Hospital, Sharjah, recorded 2015 revenues of $130.4 million, with a net income of $38.8 million. The hospital employs some 1,250 staff, including 170 doctors. It also offers facilities for visiting doctors.

In May 2018, the hospital signed an MoU with the Sharjah Health Authority to offer a 30% discount to elderly Emirati citizens. That month, it also opened a cosmetic surgery facility under the NMC-owned CosmeSurge brand.

In March 2021, Al Zahra Hospital Sharjah was renamed NMC Royal Hospital Sharjah following its acquisition and management by NMC Healthcare.
