= Lloyd Dorfman =

British entrepreneur and philanthropist

Sir Lloyd Dorfman CVO CBE
- Born: 25 August 1952 (age 74)
- Occupation: Businessman
- Known for: Founder of Travelex
- Spouse: Sarah Matthews
- Children: 3, including Charles Dorfman

Sir Lloyd Marshall Dorfman CVO CBE (born 25 August 1952) is a British entrepreneur and philanthropist. He founded Travelex, the world's largest retailer of foreign exchange.

According to The Sunday Times Rich List in 2020, Dorfman is worth £720 million.

== Early life ==
Dorfman's family were Jewish immigrants from eastern Europe who came to London before The Great War. He was educated at St Paul's. He did not attend university, but instead studied for the Bar at Lincoln's Inn for a year, but did not finish the course.

== Career ==
In 1976, Dorfman started his own currency exchange business from one small shop based in Southampton Row in central London. The company spread to ports overseas, initially in the Netherlands and Belgium. In 1986, Dorfman won Travelex a landmark contract as the first non-bank foreign exchange provider at the newly opened Heathrow Terminal 4. The company expanded into airports worldwide, opening in the US in 1989 shortly followed by Australia in 1990.

The £440m acquisition of Thomas Cook's Global & Financial Services business in March 2001 made Travelex the world's largest non-bank foreign exchange business. Dorfman began to develop the presence of the company in Asia, starting with Japan and spreading to India in 2003 and China in 2004.

Travelex sold its card programme management business to MasterCard for £290 million in 2011, and then its Global Business Payments to Western Union for £606 million. In 2014, an agreement was reached to sell Travelex to shareholders in Abu Dhabi.

Travelex pioneered sponsorship deals including Travelex Cheap Ticket Season at the National Theatre, as well as sponsoring the winning World Cup teams for Australian Cricket in 2003 and England Rugby the same year.

== Current business activity ==
He was previously chairman and majority shareholder of The Office Group, the British pioneers of co working spaces, from 2010 to 2017, before selling the business in a £500 mn deal with Blackstone in June 2017. In 2014, he co-founded and became chairman of Doddle, the e-commerce software business.

Dorfman has a number of other business interests, including shareholder and director of the London Theatre Company. He sits on Mayor of London Sadiq Khan's Business Advisory Board.

== Philanthropy ==
Dorfman became chairman of youth and enterprise charity the Prince's Trust in 2015, having joined the charity's Council in 2007. He was also the chairman of Prince's Trust International, which aims to help unemployed young people around the globe into education, training and work. He is now vice president of King's Trust International (formerly Prince's Trust International).

In addition, he is chair of the Royal Opera House, deputy chairman of the Community Security Trust, and was a trustee of the Royal Academy Trust and of JW3; and was a governor of St Paul's School from 2005 to 2016.

He was on the board of the National Theatre from 2007 to 2015, and the National Theatre's Cottesloe was renamed the Dorfman Theatre in 2013 following a gift of £10 million towards the National Theatre Future redevelopment project. Dorfman was on the board of BAFTA from 2017 to 2023.

In 2017, following a gift from the Dorfman Foundation, the Royal Academy announced the launch of two new international architecture awards, and the restoration of the Senate Rooms in Burlington Gardens to house a new architecture space and café.

In 2023, Dorfman gave £200,000 to support the Royal Academy of Dance.

== Personal life ==
Aged 22, he married Sarah Matthews, the sister of a fellow student when he spent a year studying for the Bar. Afterwards, he worked in the City for his father-in-law for a short time. They have three children, and live in London. Dorfman is a member of the Royal Yacht Squadron, White's and the Garrick Club.

== Honours and awards ==
In 2001 Dorfman was the winner of the Consumer Business Category in the UK "Entrepreneur of the Year" awards sponsored by Ernst & Young, Citibank and The Times. In 2002 he received the British American Chamber of Commerce's UK Entrepreneurial Award, and the Institute of Economic Affairs' Free Enterprise Award. In 2007 he received the Honorary Australian of the Year in the UK award.

He was appointed Commander of the Order of the British Empire (CBE) in the 2008 Birthday Honours for services to business and charity. He was knighted in the 2018 Birthday Honours for services to philanthropy and the arts. He was appointed Commander of the Royal Victorian Order (CVO) in the 2022 Birthday Honours for services to the Prince's Trust.

In 2011, he was awarded The Prince of Wales Medal for Arts Philanthropy. He is an honorary fellow of St Peter's College, Oxford and an Honorary Bencher of Lincoln's Inn He was awarded an honorary doctorate by Buckingham University in 2016. He is also Honorary Colonel of the 3rd Battalion, Princess of Wales's Royal Regiment.
