= B. R. Shetty =

Indian businessman

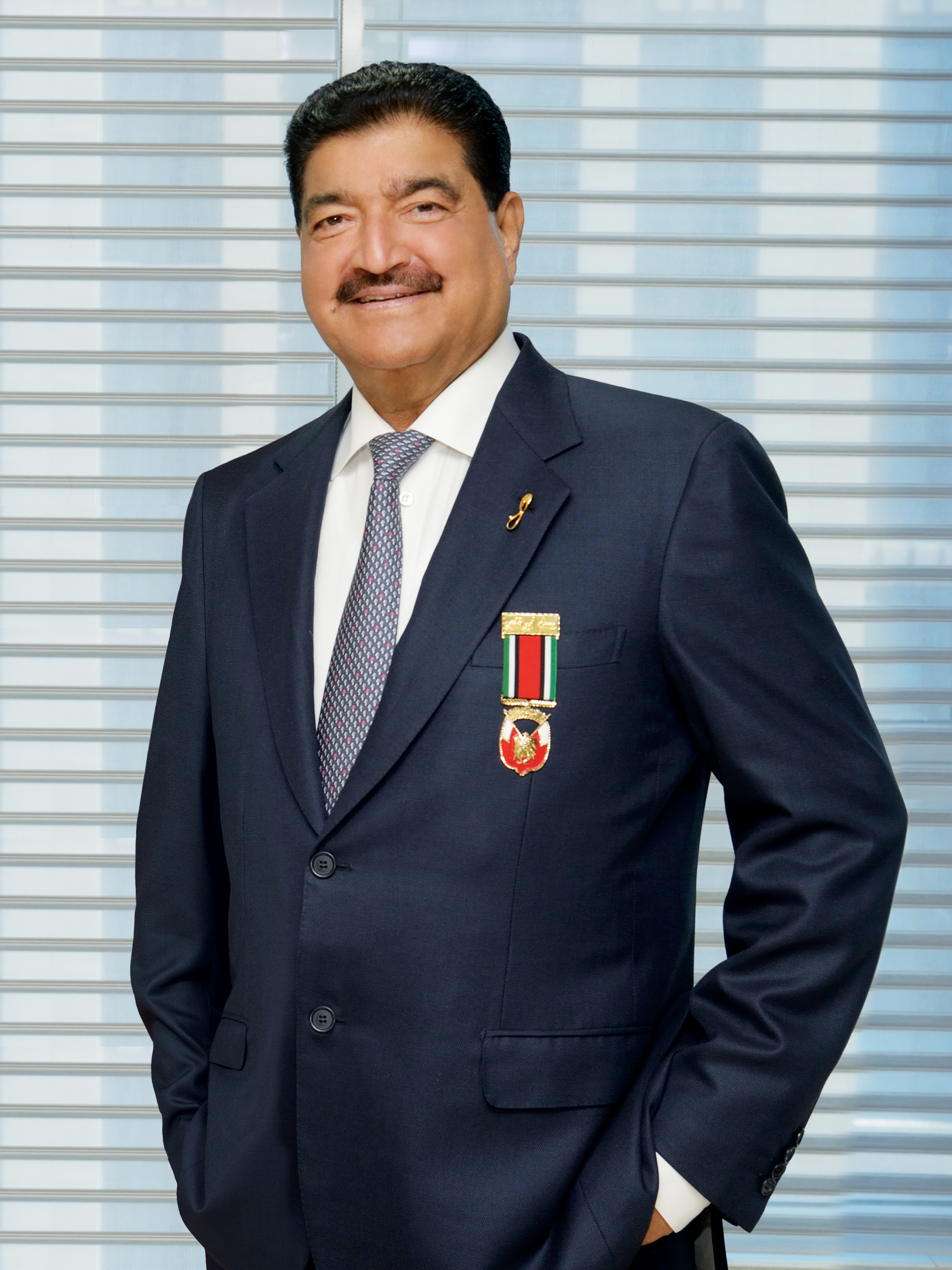
- Official picture of Dr. Shetty, taken in NMC premises in 2016
- Born: Bavaguthu Raghuram Shetty; 1 August 1942 (age 83); Udupi, Madras Presidency, British India (now Karnataka, India)
- Known for: NMC Health (founder; now defunct); Finablr (founder; now defunct)
- Honours: • Pravasi Bharatiya Samman (2007) • Padma Sri (2009)

Bavaguthu Raghuram Shetty (born 1 August 1942) is an Indian-born businessman and former billionaire, the founder and acquirer of a number of companies based in the United Arab Emirates, including Abu Dhabi–based NMC Health, Neopharma, BRS Ventures, and Finablr.

In 1975, Shetty's interest was in hospitals and hospitality. He then diversified into pharmaceuticals, financial services, retail, advertising, and information technology. He was included on the Forbes list of India's 100 Richest People in 2015 and was listed as the 42nd richest person in 2019.

In 2020, Shetty resigned from his board position while investigations were underway. On 8 April 2020, NMC Health went into administration in the United Kingdom due to corporate governance concerns and a share price in freefall. Due to sharp drops in share prices, and shares pledged by Shetty to pay for debts incurred, it is believed that his net worth has fallen to a fraction of the earlier estimate of $3.5 billion. Consequently, Forbes dropped Shetty from its 2020 annual list of billionaires.

On 15 April 2020, Abu Dhabi Commercial Bank filed a criminal complaint against NMC Health with the Attorney General's Office of UAE. Indian agencies initiated a probe to identify potential risks to Indian banks, if any. On 27 April 2020, the Central Bank of UAE ordered the freezing of his accounts and the blacklisting of his firms.

== Early life ==
Shetty was born at the family's ancestral estate, Bavaguthu House Udupi on 1 August 1942 into a Tulu speaking, Bunt family, the son of Shambhu Shetty and his wife Koosamma Shetty. His mother tongue is Tulu and he studied in a Kannada medium school. Shetty completed his pharmaceutical education from Manipal in India and also served as the Vice-Chairman of the Municipal Council in Udupi. He married Chandrakumari Shetty and has four children.

== Career ==
Shetty immigrated to the UAE in the year 1973. After working as the country's first medical representative, he founded New Medical Centre Health (NMC) in 1975 to fill the need for personalized, cost-effective healthcare accessible to all. At that time, his wife was the only doctor in the clinic. NMC is now the largest private healthcare provider in the UAE with over four million patients annually across 45 facilities spread over 12 cities and 8 countries, including UAE, KSA, Oman, Spain, Italy, Denmark, Colombia, and Brazil. It is the first healthcare company from the Gulf Cooperation Countries (GCC) and the first company from Abu Dhabi to be listed on the premium segment of the London Stock Exchange and was part of the coveted FTSE 100 Index. Consequent to the request from the NMC board of directors and an on-going investigation of potential financial irregularities, the company was de-listed from London Stock Exchange and was removed from FTSE 100 index.

Multiple reputable sources describe Dr. B. R. Shetty as the founder or the individual who established UAE Exchange in 1980 to facilitate remittance services for expatriates sending funds to their families in their home countries.. By 2016, it had expanded into over 31 countries and had approximately 800 direct offices. In 2014, it did over US$50 billion collectively in money remittance and exchange volumes. Shetty acquired Travelex, a major foreign exchange company, in 2014. Travelex has a global footprint including 1500 stores and 1300 ATMs across 27 countries. In December 2020 it was announced that Shetty had agreed to sell his majority stake in Finablr, the parent group for UAE Exchange and Travelex, to Prism Group AG and Royal Strategic Partners, a UAE linked investment fund.

In 2003, Shetty founded NMC Neopharma, a UAE-based pharmaceutical manufacturer. Inaugurated by the then President of India, A. P. J. Abdul Kalam in Abu Dhabi, Neopharma is centered on using the concept of modular manufacturing following global benchmarks in manufacturing technology and putting in place efficient control mechanisms. Neopharma has a research and development wing and works to provide quality medicines at affordable prices. The company also contracts manufacturing for international pharmaceutical companies as well as generic brands for companies including, but not limited to, Merck, Pfizer, AstraZeneca, and Boots UK.

In 2012, Shetty led NMC through an IPO on the London Stock Exchange, which raised $330 million. The funds went towards building a specialty hospital in Khalifa City, Abu Dhabi.

In June 2016, Shetty announced that he was building the first medical university in Abu Dhabi in honor of Sheikh Zayed. That same month, he was elected to be chairman of the Indian Business/Professional Group. In August 2016, Shetty announced that he was building a 400-bed super-specialty hospital in Udupi in Karnataka through B R S Ventures. Shetty also owned a hospital in Alexandria, two hospitals in Nepal, and acquired a hospital in Cairo as part of his personal portfolio under the same company.

In August 2019, BRS Ventures announced plans to invest $5 billion in developing healthcare facilities across India.

In February 2020, reports emerged regarding shareholder disclosures and ownership interests in NMC Health. During the same period, Shetty resigned from his position as Co-Chairman and Director of NMC Health while investigations and regulatory reviews concerning the company were underway.

During that period, the company experienced a number of developments related to corporate governance and financial disclosures.

On 8 April 2020, NMC went into Administration in the UK due to the insolvency of the company.

== Philanthropy ==
In May 2018, Shetty along with three other Abu Dhabi–based business tycoons signed The Giving Pledge.

== Other activities ==
Shetty was an activist of the erstwhile Jan Sangh, the predecessor to the BJP, before he went to the UAE.

Shetty played a key role in organizing a visit of Modi to Abu Dhabi.

Shetty has invested in a medical institution in the north Indian state of Uttarakhand. He is the founder and patron of the Indian Pharmaceutical Association in the Emirates, and is a member of the Advisory Board (Financial Sector), Economic Department, Government of Dubai, UAE, and the Pharmaceutical Committee, Dubai. He was the chairman of Abu Dhabi Indian School, Abu Dhabi Indian School-Branch 1, Al Wathba, and Bright Riders School until 2019. His position in Abu Dhabi Indian School and Abu Dhabi Indian School-Branch 1, Al Wathba was taken up by the UAE-based Indian billionaire Yusuff Ali M.A.

In August 2015, Shetty was elected as the chairman to the board of directors of UAE Exchange. He was named chairman of The Indian Business/Professional Group in June 2016. Sheikh Mohammed bin Rashid al Maktoum nominated Shetty as a member of the UAE medical council in September 2016.

In April 2017, Shetty announced that he would invest Rs 1000 crore ($157.3 million) to produce a film with director V. A. Shrikumar Menon. The film, starring Mohanlal, was to be based on the novel Randamoozham, a retelling of Mahabharata. In May 2019, however, the film was shelved due to creative issues.

== Awards and recognition ==
In 2005, Shetty was awarded the highest civilian distinction in the Emirate, the Abu Dhabi Awards. Given by Sheikh Mohammed bin Zayed Al Nahyan, the Crown Prince of Abu Dhabi, the first year the distinction was awarded. Also in 2005, U.S. India Friendship Society presented Shetty the Distinguished Entrepreneur Award.

The Indian government gave Shetty the Pravasi Bharatiya Samman award in 2007. Shetty received the Padma Shri awarded by the President of India in 2009.
