= Bureau de change =

Business where a currency can be exchanged for another

A bureau de change (plural bureaux de change, both /ˌbjʊəroʊ də ˈʃɒnʒ/ BURE-oh də SHONZH; British English) or currency exchange (American English) is a business where people can buy or sell a foreign currency.

== Nomenclature ==
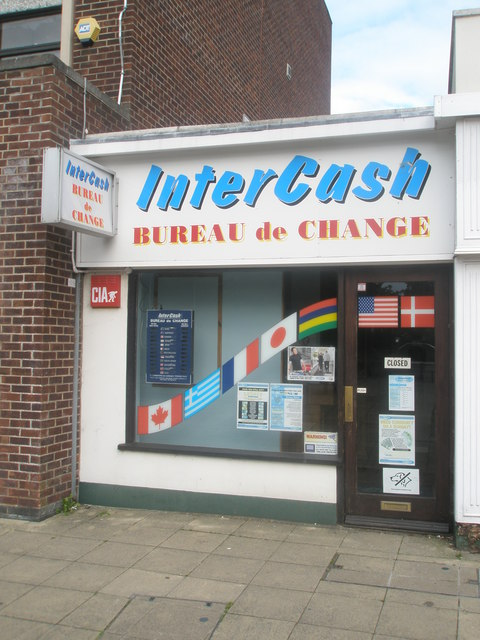
A bureau de change in Waterlooville, England.

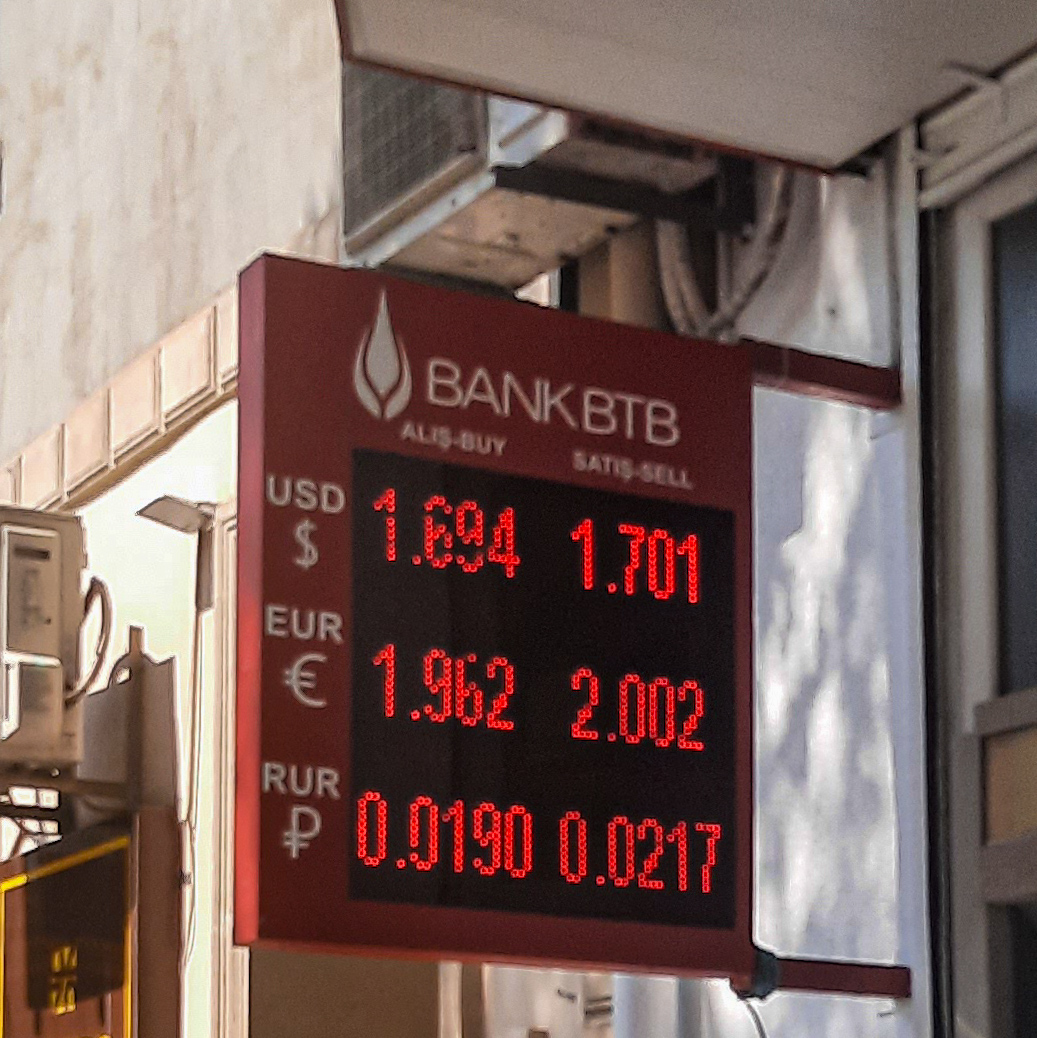
An exchange in Baku with a digital sign to reflect dynamic exchange rates

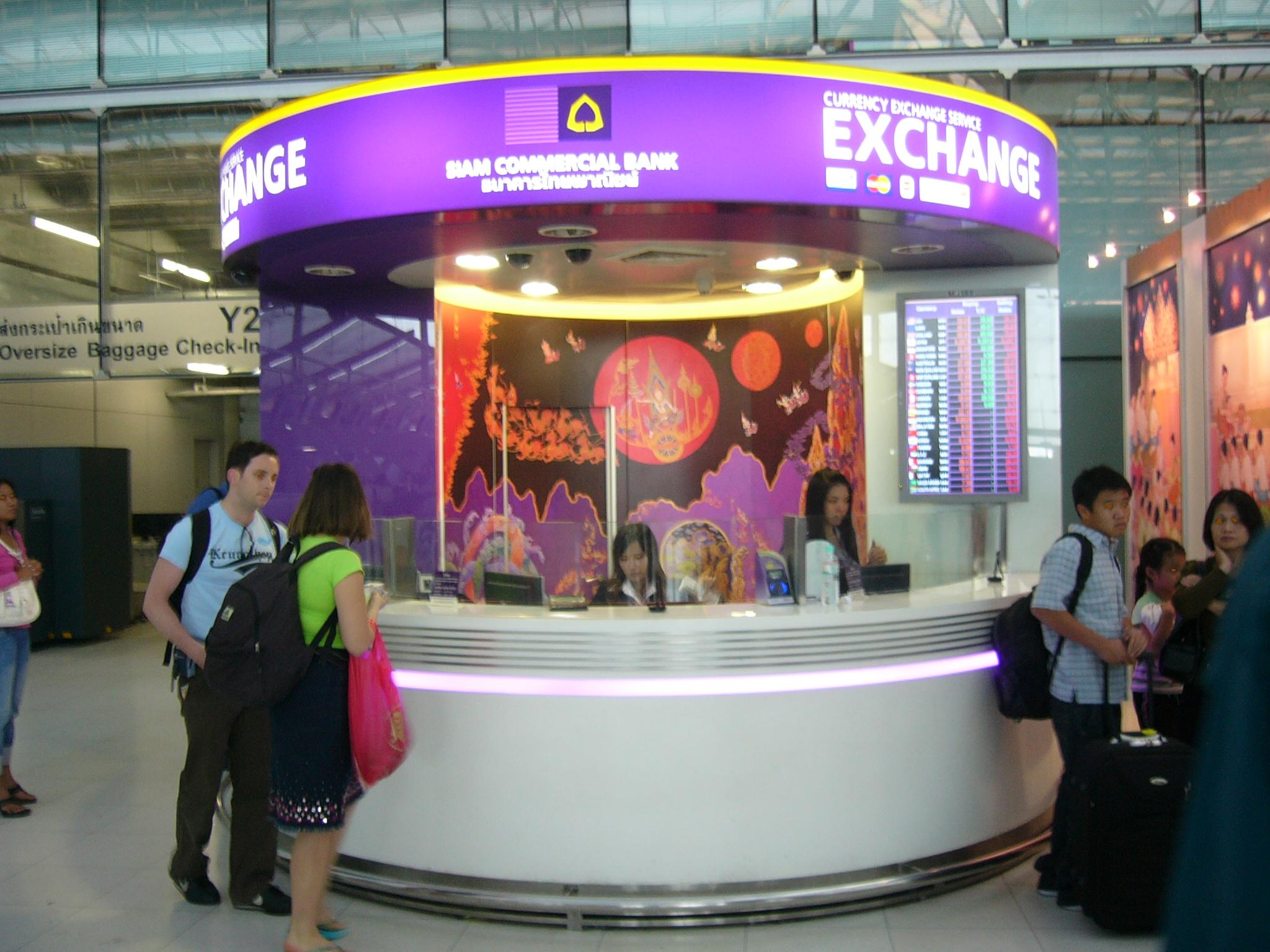
A bureau de change at a Thai airport.

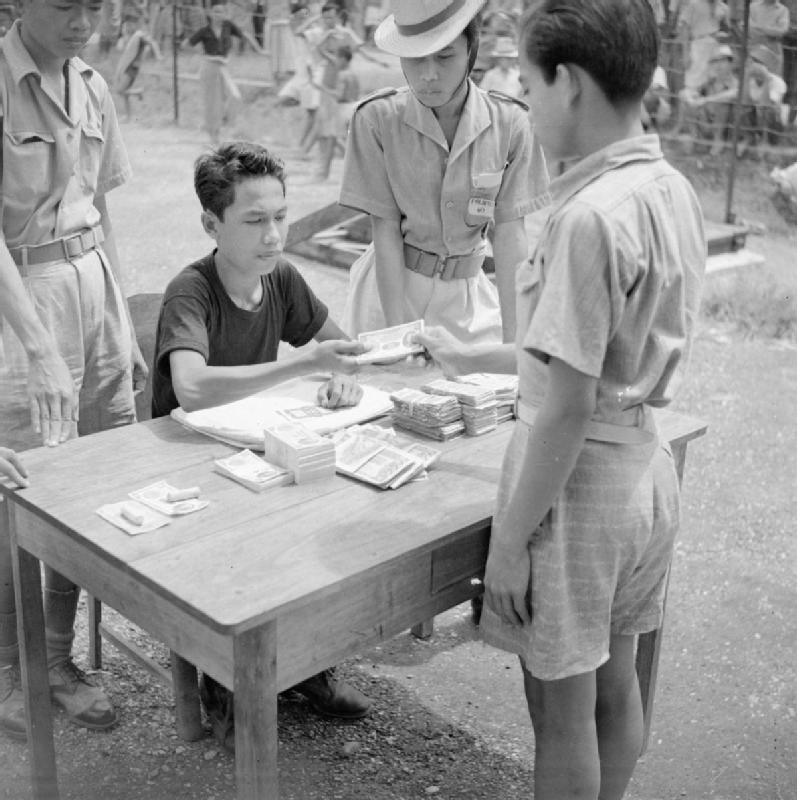
Indonesians in Sulawesi exchanging occupation currency for guilders in 1945

Originally French, the term bureau de change (pronounced [byʁo d(ə) ʃɑ̃ʒ]) is widely used throughout Europe and French-speaking Canada, where it is common to find a sign saying "exchange" or "change". Since the adoption of the euro, many exchange offices have started incorporating its logotype prominently on their signage. In the United States and English-speaking Canada the business is described as "currency exchange" and sometimes "money exchange", sometimes with various additions such as "foreign", "desk", "office", "counter", "service", etc.; for example, "foreign currency exchange office".

== Location ==
Bureaux de change are often located at a bank, travel agent, airport, main railway station, large supermarket branches, and anywhere else where there is likely to be a market for people needing to it of sell a foreign currency. They are particularly prominently located at travel hubs, although currency can be exchanged in many other ways, both legally or by using a non-official black market dealer. Some of the major foreign exchange companies are HSBC, Travelex, JPMorgan Chase & Co., Wells Fargo, and Bank of America.

== Business models ==
A bureau de change is a business which, in competition with other similar businesses, makes its profit by buying foreign currency and then selling the same currency at a higher exchange rate. The dealer may also charge commission or fee on transactions. In setting its exchange rates and fees, the business would keep an eye on changing market conditions, as well as the rates quoted by competitors, and may be subject to government foreign exchange controls and other regulations, but an unofficial market (or black market may bypass government regulations.

Exchange rates are usually quoted in relation to one unit of the local currency, or in relation to one unit of one of the major international currencies. The bureau normally sells a currency at a higher rate from that at which it buys it. For example, a UK bureau may buy euros at a rate of say €1.40 for £1 and a sell the euros at a rate of €1.60 for £1. The exchange rates charged by a bureau are generally based on the spot prices available for large interbank transactions, and which the bureau will adjust to enable it to earn a profit. The bureau will also need to take account of volatility in the market. However, in a dynamic market, a dealer may be caught out if rates fall while the dealer holds a declining value currency.

For example, suppose that the spot price on a particular day is €1.50 to £1. Theoretically, an average consumer could exchange £2 and receive €3 (or vice versa), but in practice they would find it very hard if not impossible to secure such a rate. On that same day, a bureau de change might buy £1 for €1.40 and sell £1 for €1.60. If a consumer sold £1 to the bureau and then immediately bought back as much currency as possible, they would end up with (1.40 / 1.60) = £0.875, leaving the bureau with a revenue of 12.5 pence (12.5% of the original £1).

This business model can be upset by a currency run when there is a great imbalance between buyers and sellers because they feel a particular currency is overvalued or undervalued.

The business may also charge a commission on the transaction. Commission is generally charged as a percentage of the amount to be exchanged, or a fixed fee, or both. Some bureaux do not charge commission but may adjust their offered exchange rates. Some bureaux offer special deals for customers returning unspent foreign currency after a holiday. Bureaux de change rarely buy or sell coins, but sometimes will at a higher profit margin, justifying this by the higher cost of storage and shipping compared with banknotes.

In recent years, together with the emergence of online banking, currency exchange services have appeared on the Internet. This new model allows more competitive exchange rates and threatens traditional brick-and-mortar bureaux de change. Online currency exchange has two main models: the more popular model is provided by an established bureau de change, while social currency exchange platforms such as WeSwap allows participants to ask or bid for currency at their own rates (usually with an additional transaction fee).

== Peer-to-peer foreign exchanges ==
The rise of peer-to-peer foreign currency exchange platforms and of related financial companies has led to disruptive P2P currency exchange platforms that significantly undercuts traditional banks and financial institutions. Providers that use the P2P model to satisfy offsetting currency demands without an intermediary (such as a broker) has resulted in significant margin and spread compression in the foreign exchange business model.

== Consumer issues ==
Changing money at a bureau is often more expensive than withdrawing it from an automatic teller machine at one's destination or paying directly by debit or credit card, but this varies depending on the card issuer and the type of account. Fees from multiple ATM withdrawals should also be considered. Some people may feel uncomfortable carrying a lot of cash and so prefer to use a card and carry minimal cash for tipping cabs, hotels, and restaurants. Hotels and rental cars many times also need cards for temporary holds.

Some may also prefer to hold foreign currency rather than change it back if they are expecting to return to where it is used. Companies that frequently send employees abroad may essentially act as their own exchange by reimbursing their employees in the local currency and holding the foreign currency. If exchange rates are relatively stable, the fees charged by a bureau may exceed any likely fluctuation and it also makes the company's accountancy easier.

In the alternate, some prefer to buy their currency before they travel, either just for a sense of security against credit card fraud typically achieved by tampered card readers or hackers, or because they expect to benefit from more favorable conditions thinking the exchange rate is better at that time than it will be when they make their trip. As well, some places may only take cash or have credit card terminals down.

In 2002, many bureaux reported substantial reductions in profit due to the replacement of 12 legacy European currencies with the euro.

== Illegal activity ==
Bureaux de change offer an opportunity for money laundering, and a number of countries require bureaux de change to register as money service businesses and are subject to their anti–money laundering measures. The Financial Action Task Force offers a set of recommendations for money services businesses to identify and report risky customers and transactions. However, it is up to the various regulatory authorities to set out the specific regulations that govern the money services businesses in different countries.

== See also ==
- CLS Group
- Currency pair
- Digital currency exchanger
- Exchange rate
- Financial instruments
- Foreign exchange company
- Foreign exchange reserves
- Gold standard
- List of international trade topics
- Money changer
- Money laundering
