= WeSwap =

Foreign exchange company

- Website type: Private
- Available in: Multilingual
- Founded: March 3, 2011; 15 years ago
- Headquarters: London, {{{location_country}}}
- Founders: Jared Jesner, Simon Sacerdoti
- Services: Travel money
- Employees: 10 (2021)
- Website: www.weswap.com
- Registration: Yes
- Launched: July 2013; 13 years ago
- Current status: administration

WeSwap was a peer-to-peer currency exchange platform. WeSwap matched travellers heading in opposite directions and swapped their travel money directly. The London-based startup company was launched in 2013 by Jared Jesner and Simon Sacerdoti, and supported 18 different currencies around the world. It is now defunct.

== History ==
The WeSwap idea first stemmed from founder Jared Jesner's experiences as a city trader at JP Morgan: "I saw first hand the amazing rates that banks can change money at... but there was no way for consumers to access that same rate.". He went on to work for Royal Dutch Shell, where his exposure to the world of payments inspired the idea to partner with a prepaid card provider as the delivery mechanism for the service. At Shell, he was also introduced to corporate finance adviser Simon Sacerdoti, whose experience enabled them to start commercialising the idea and together they co-founded the service. At launch, the service supported 6 currencies. In 2014, WeSwap was serving customers from across 10 European countries and supported 18 currencies. In March 2018, WeSwap launched the ability to spend globally, anywhere the Mastercard symbol is accepted. This is alongside continuing to support 18 swappable currencies.

== Investors ==
Seed funding came from a mixture of high net worth angel investors and super angels., including LoveFilm and Zoopla co-founder Alex Chesterman and Andy Murray. In October 2014, one year after launching, WeSwap secured another £4.5M in Series A funding. This was led and structured by IW Capital and supported by EC1 Capital along with the investors who had helped to raise £1.2M in seed funds.

== Awards ==
In January 2015, WeSwap won the 'Innovation in Travel Award' at the Globe Travel Awards. Commercial director of Travelport, Paul Broughton, who presented the trophy said: "Our winner showed the most potential for disrupting its marketplace and changing how business is done." In March 2018, WeSwap won the Best Travel Money Provider at the British Bank Awards.

== Collapse and Administration ==
In December 2021, WeSwap became a victim of the global collapse in travel following the Covid-19 pandemic and entered administration. WeSwap’s business and assets were sold in a pre-packaged administration sale to a third party, MK Fintech Limited, a subsidiary of the Blackthorn Group. This pre-pack deal is expected to leave investors more than £20 million out of pocket.

In September 2024 the failure of Manigo, the technology service provider and the termination of the card service by e-money issuer Monavate Ltd. WeSwap cards and the phone app stopped working. This was followed up in October 2024 with this statement from WeSwap -

"After careful consideration, the management team have made the difficult decision to cease administrative operations in relation to the distribution of the travel money program and mobile app effective 8th October. This is following the failure of Manigo, the technology service provider and the termination of the card service by e-money issuer Monavate Ltd.

While we have been working behind the scenes to support our partners in maintaining the continuity of their payments services, this decision was not made lightly. With a continued focus on prioritising consumers, we remain committed to ensuring a smooth transition for all WeSwap mobile app and cardholders."

== See also ==
- Financial technology
