= NMC Health =

UAE healthcare chain and distribution business

- Type: Public
- Traded as: LSE: NMC (Suspended as of 9 April 2020)
- Industry: Health
- Founded: 1974
- Founder: B. R. Shetty
- Defunct: 2020
- Headquarters: Abu Dhabi, United Arab Emirates
- Key people: David Hadley (CEO)
- Revenue: ▲$2,057.3 million (2018)
- Operating income: ▲$379.8 million (2018)
- Net income: ▲$251.9 million (2018)
- Number of employees: c.18,000 (2018)
- Website: www.nmc.ae

NMC Health (Arabic: مستشفى المركز الطبي الجديد) was a healthcare chain and distribution business in the United Arab Emirates (UAE). The company is headquartered in Abu Dhabi and has branch offices in Dubai, Ajman, Al Ain and Northern Emirates. As of 2019, the company operated and managed over 200 facilities in 19 countries.

The company was accused, in late 2019, of understating debt on its balance sheet, and later revealed that debt of US$2.7 billion had not been reported.

On 8 April 2020, NMC was placed into administration by UK High Court judge Sebastian Prentis, due to the insolvency of the company caused by fraud alleged to have been committed by the founder and chairman of the board, B. R. Shetty.

In 2023, the UK Financial Conduct Authority (FCA) censured the company for committing market abuse by understating its debts by as much as $4bn. No fine was issued as the business was not expected to have any funds left after paying debts.

== History ==
NMC Health was founded by B. R. Shetty in 1974 in Abu Dhabi as the New Medical Centre. In 1981, a new marketing & distribution division, NMC Trading, was launched, which distributed medicines to pharmacies in the UAE. This division would later expand into distribution of fast-moving consumer goods, medical equipments and supplies and educational products.

From 1996, NMC began expanding to other emirates, setting up the NMC Clinic in Sharjah (1996), the NMC Hospital in Deira, Dubai (1999), the NMC Specialty Hospital in Dubai (2004) and NMC Specialty Hospital in Al Ain (2008). In 2009, these hospitals were awarded the JCIA accreditation. In April 2012, NMC listed on the London Stock Exchange. That same year, NMC began managing operations at the Shiekh Khalifa General Hospital in Umm Al Quwain, acquired the BR Medical Suites in Dubai Healthcare City and continued their expansion with the addition of new medical setups, such as NMC Royal Hospital in Khalifa City and operations in Al Ain's industrial area. In 2013, the company added a day-surgery centre in Mohammed Bin Zayed City in Abu Dhabi. In 2014, NMC Health opened the NMC Hospital in Dubai Investments Park, NMC Brightpoint Royal Women's Hospital, and the NMC Medical Centre in Al Ain.

NMC Health acquired the Spain-based Clínica Eugin in 2015, allowing the company to become the leading integrated women's health provider from fertility through obstetrics and pediatrics in the UAE. That same year, the company also acquired three UAE-based medical groups — the Dr. Sunny Healthcare Group (a leading set of medical clinics in Sharjah and the Northern Emirates), Provita, and Americare Group Abu Dhabi (focused on long-term care and rehabilitation) — and acquired a 51% stake in Fakih IVF, another leading fertility clinic in UAE.

In August 2016, the company expanded its operations into Saudi Arabia when it acquired a 70 percent stake in As Salama Hospital in Al Khobar; NMC Health also invested in a project to build a 120-bed care centre in Jeddah that would be managed by its subsidiary, Provita. In December 2016, NMC Health announced the acquisition of Al Zahra Hospital, one of the largest private hospitals in the UAE. In 2017, Emirates Healthcare, owned by Abu Dhabi investment group KBBO, announced the signing of an operating and management contract with NMC Health for the management of their Emirates Healthcare assets.

The company was selected by the Abu Dhabi National Oil Company (ADNOC) to manage operations of Ruwais Hospital in the Al Dhafra region in March 2018.In August 2017, NMC Health bought Aspen Healthcare for £10 million.

=== Under-reporting of debt ===
In December 2019, short-seller Muddy Waters questioned the company's statement of accounts, concerned that NMC had "manipulated its balance sheet to understate debt" and contained statements which were "hallmarks of significant fraud".

In February 2020, Executive Vice Chairman Khalifa Butti Omeir Bin Yousef resigned from NMC. The company said a legal review was being undertaken to verify the total interests of some of its shareholders over concerns they have been incorrectly reported. Later in the month, shares in the company were suspended from trading amid concerns that debt had been under-reported: the Financial Conduct Authority (FCA) announced an investigation.

Also in February 2020, as per the regulatory fillings to the London Stock Exchange, the company disclosed the "highly preliminary approaches" made by the private equity groups Kohlberg Kravis Roberts and Switzerland-based GK Investment for possible buyout. However, Kohlberg Kravis Roberts withdrew by 11 February 2020, and GK Investment withdrew by the end of February.

In March 2020 the company reported that:

it has identified over $2.7 billion in facilities that had previously not been disclosed to or approved by the Board ... The Board believes that some proceeds may have been utilised for non-Group purposes.

This meant that the actual indebtedness was not $2.1 billion, as previously reported, but circa $5 billion as of 30 June 2019. On 24 March 2020, the total debt was estimated at $6.6 billion. Many employees were not paid at that time.

On 8 April 2020, NMC went into administration in the UK due to the insolvency of the company caused by alleged fraud committed by founder and then-chairman of the board, B.R. Shetty. Consequent to the request from the board of directors of NMC and ongoing investigation of potential financial irregularities, the company was suspended from its listing on the London Stock Exchange.

On 15 April 2020, Abu Dhabi Commercial Bank filed a criminal complaint against NMC Health with the Attorney General's Office of UAE. In May 2020, NMC Health filed for Chapter 15 bankruptcy in the United States, allowing administrators to "maximize the value of assets owned in the U.S."

In December 2020, Shetty sold the company for $1 to an Israeli-UAE consortium.

In April 2021, HSBC and Standard Chartered cleared around $370M worth of positions in NMC's debt in two separate auctions, as more information about likely restructuring recoveries became available.

In 2023, the UK FCA censured the company for committing market abuse by understating its debts by as much as $4bn. No fine was issued as the business was not expected to have any funds left after paying debts.

== Operations ==
NMC Health operated two business segments: healthcare distribution and services. The healthcare arm operated an international network of hospitals around the UAE and Europe. It was the largest private healthcare provider in the UAE and provided medical services including diagnostics, outpatient clinics, gynecology, obstetrics, human reproduction and pharmacy retail. In 2017, it operated more than 45 locations and more than 15 pharmacies, and employed over 1,200 doctors who saw more than 11,000 patients daily. NMC Health's distribution and services arm operated the subsidiary, NMC Trading, which engaged in wholesale trading of pharmaceuticals, medical equipment, food and cosmetics. NMC Trading had distribution rights for companies such as, Nestlé, Pfizer, Siemens, Samsung, Sanofi and Henkel.
