= UAE Exchange =

Emirati company

- Company type: Division
- Industry: Financial services
- Founded: 1980; 46 years ago
- Headquarters: Abu Dhabi, UAE
- Products: Remittance; Bill payments; Money transfer; Foreign exchange
- Number of employees: 9,000 (2015)
- Parent: Finablr
- Subsidiaries: Money2Anywhere; Smart Pay; Unimoni; GoCash
- Website: www.uaeexchange.com.kw www.unimoni.in

UAE Exchange (Arabic: مركز الإمارات العربية المتحدة للصرافة; Markaz Al'Imarat Alearabiat Almutahidat Lilsarafa) was a United Arab Emirates-based company dealing primarily in remittance, foreign exchange and bill payment services.

The company was headquartered in Abu Dhabi, UAE, and operates through 800 locations across 31 countries either as UAE Exchange, or Unimoni.

The business has over 9,000 employees across 40 countries. It is one of the largest remittance companies and has an extensive network in the Middle East and Asia with particular emphasis on India where over 40% of its offices and staff are located.

== International brands ==
In 2018, UAE Exchange started to change its brand to “Unimoni” in locations outside the UAE. This initially started with retail presence in India, Fiji, Canada, and Australia. Since then, markets such as Hong Kong and Tanzania, as well as others, have been renamed Unimoni.

== History ==
=== Foundation and growth ===
UAE Exchange established its first branch and operations in Abu Dhabi, UAE in the year 1980.

In 1993, UAE Exchange became a SWIFT member and over the following two years opened operations in Oman and Kuwait, as well as launching transfer, gold card, and banknote services. In 1999, it launched retail operations in India, which was to become the largest operation outside its home base, with 330 branches by 2015. It opened offices in Bangladesh, the United Kingdom, and Sri Lanka over the following three years.

In 2001, it launched Xpress Money, a money transfer service in the UK. Xpress Money was later extracted into the wider group.

In 2003, the business added Australia to its network, and it also launched services for the corporate (B2B) sector.

In 2004, it introduced online money transfers.

Between 2005 and 2009 it opened offices in Hong Kong, Uganda, Jordan, Canada, New Zealand, and China, as well as purchasing MoneyDart Global Services in the United States. The business also launched an online money transfer brand, Money2anywhere.com. XPay; a mobile bill payment application was also purchased in India.

In 2009 it became an Authorised Payment Institution with the UK financial regulator Financial Services Authority (which later became the Financial Conduct Authority).

=== International re-branding ===
In 2018, [UAE Exchange] began re-branding to "Unimoni" at locations outside of the United Arab Emirates. This initially started with its retail presence in India, Fiji, Canada and Australia. Markets such as Hong Kong and Tanzania, as well as further afield have also since been re-branded as Unimoni.

In October 2018, UAE Exchange partnered with telecommunications company Ooredoo.

In March 2019 Sudhir Shetty left the business. Prior to his role as president of the business which he had held since 1991, he had served as its chief operating officer.

=== Finablr and its collapse ===
Mid 2019 Finablr began co-branding businesses within its estate which included UAE Exchange.

On 16 March 2020, UAE Exchange suspended all new transactions citing "certain operational challenges" in an emailed statement. Although the statement issued by the business fails to mention it directly, the challenges referenced likely pertain to the near-collapse of its parent Finablr earlier that same day.

On 16 March 2020, Finablr, of which UAE Exchange is a part, was suspended from the London Stock Exchange as it announced it was in danger of collapse having identified circa $100m (£81m) of undisclosed financing, which meant it no longer had any certainty over its financial position. Simultaneously, Promoth Manghat, Group CEO left the business. The business also stated that it was no longer able to provide certain payment processing services, however, failed to address what services this entailed. Administrator Kroll was appointed to carry out an independent investigation into its finances.

On 17 March 2020, Finablr announced that it has engaged an accountancy firm to undertake rapid contingency planning for a potential insolvency appointment,

On 18 March 2020, Finablr announced that the division had been placed under the supervision of the Central Bank of the UAE with immediate effect. The Central Bank of the UAE also stated that it had commenced an examination of the UAE Exchange in order to verify its compliance with applicable laws and regulations. Although in principle change of control approval for the sale of UAE Exchange was granted in September 2021, this sale did proceed and UAE Exchange remains under the supervision of the Central Bank of the UAE

During June 2020, Xpress Money, a group business, had its authorisation to operate withdrawn by the UK's Financial Conduct Authority.

"Xpress Money Services Limited must cease carrying on all the payment services activities for which it has previously been authorised by the FCA, except to the extent as agreed with the FCA. The firm may only carry out payment service activities."

== Subsidiaries ==
- UAE Exchange & Financial Services, in India with over 330 offices
- UAE Exchange Australia Pty Ltd
- UAE Exchange Centre Bahrain Co WLL
- UAE Exchange Centre LLC, Liaison Office
- UAE Exchange Canada Pty Ltd
- UAE Exchange China Liaison Office
- UAE Exchange Fiji Pty Ltd
- UAE Exchange Hong Kong Limited
- UAE Exchange Centre LLC, Liaison Office, India
- UAE Exchange Centre LLC, Liaison Office, Indonesia
- Jordan UAE Exchange LLC Co
- Kuwait National Exchange Co
- UAE Exchange New Zealand Pty Ltd
- Oman & UAE Exchange Centre Co LLC
- UAE Exchange Centre LLC, Liaison Office, Pakistan
- UAE Exchange Centre LLC, Liaison Office, Philippines
- Qatar- UAE Exchange Establishment
- UAE Exchange Centre LLC, Liaison Office, Sri Lanka
- UAE Exchange Centre LLC, Sudan
- UAE Exchange Uganda Limited
- UAE Exchange Centre LLC, UAE
- UAE Exchange Centre LLC, UK
- MoneyDart Global Services, Inc, USA
- Nyuvo, India
- UAE Exchange & Finance Ltd, India
- XM Software Solutions private Ltd
- XM Services Ltd
