= List of countries by access to financial services =

The following list ranks countries by the share of population with access to financial services. Access to financial services is defined as the share of the adult population (population ages 15+) with an account ownership at a financial institution or with a mobile-money-service provider. The data for the ranking taken from the Global Financial Inclusion Database, which was compiled by the World Bank. Available indicators are reported for 2021–22, 2017, 2014, and 2011.

Account ownership at a financial institution or with a mobile-money-service provider (% of population ages 15+)
Country/Territory	2011	2014	2017	2021–22
(United Nations) WORLD	50.63	61.92	68.50	76.20
Afghanistan	9.01	9.96	14.89	9.65
Angola	39.20	29.32	—	—
Albania	28.27	37.99	40.02	44.17
United Arab Emirates	59.73	83.74	88.21	85.74
Argentina	33.13	50.20	48.71	71.63
Armenia	17.49	17.67	47.76	55.35
Australia	99.06	98.86	99.52	99.32
Austria	97.08	96.73	98.16	99.95
Azerbaijan	14.90	29.15	28.57	46.26
Burundi	7.24	7.11	—	—
Belgium	96.31	98.13	98.64	99.01
Benin	10.46	16.62	38.49	48.61
Burkina Faso	13.35	14.36	43.16	36.11
Bangladesh	31.74	30.99	50.05	52.81
Bulgaria	52.82	62.99	72.20	83.97
Bahrain	64.51	81.94	82.61	—
Bosnia and Herzegovina	56.21	52.69	58.84	79.34
Belarus	58.60	71.98	81.16	—
Belize	—	48.21	—	—
Bolivia	28.03	41.80	54.41	68.89
Brazil	55.86	68.12	70.04	84.04
Bhutan	—	33.67	—	—
Botswana	30.26	51.96	51.03	58.76
Central African Republic	3.30	—	13.75	—
Canada	95.80	99.10	99.73	99.63
Switzerland	—	97.99	98.43	99.49
Chile	42.18	63.26	74.35	87.06
China	63.82	78.93	79.53	88.71
Ivory Coast	—	34.32	41.33	50.76
Cameroon	14.81	12.18	34.59	51.65
Democratic Republic of the Congo	3.70	17.48	25.83	27.44
Republic of the Congo	10.05	17.07	26.09	47.14
Colombia	30.43	39.00	45.76	59.72
Comoros	21.69	—	—	34.25
Costa Rica	50.36	64.55	67.84	68.49
Cyprus	85.24	90.15	88.72	93.13
Czech Republic	80.65	82.18	80.99	94.94
Germany	98.13	98.76	99.14	99.98
Djibouti	12.27	—	—	—
Denmark	99.74	100.00	99.92	100.00
Dominican Republic	38.20	54.09	56.24	51.30
Algeria	33.29	50.48	42.78	44.10
Ecuador	36.74	46.21	51.25	64.18
Egypt	9.72	14.13	32.78	27.44
Spain	93.28	97.58	93.76	98.30
Estonia	96.82	97.67	97.99	99.38
Ethiopia	—	21.79	34.83	46.48
Finland	99.65	100.00	99.79	99.53
France	96.98	96.58	94.00	99.24
Gabon	18.95	33.01	58.60	66.09
United Kingdom	97.20	98.93	96.37	99.76
Georgia	32.98	39.67	61.23	70.50
Ghana	29.43	40.51	57.72	68.23
Guinea	3.69	6.96	23.49	30.44
Gambia	—	—	28.56	33.01
Greece	77.94	87.52	85.47	94.88
Guatemala	22.32	41.35	44.11	36.98
Hong Kong	88.69	96.15	95.28	97.80
Honduras	20.51	31.49	45.34	37.85
Croatia	88.39	86.03	86.14	91.80
Haiti	22.01	18.86	32.62	—
Hungary	72.67	72.26	74.94	88.22
Indonesia	19.58	36.06	48.86	51.76
India	35.23	53.14	79.88	77.53
Ireland	93.89	94.71	95.34	99.66
Iran	73.68	92.28	93.98	89.98
Iraq	10.55	10.97	22.67	18.57
Iceland	—	—	—	100.00
Israel	90.47	89.95	92.81	92.93
Italy	71.01	87.33	93.79	97.29
Jamaica	70.99	78.46	—	73.30
Jordan	25.47	24.62	42.49	47.12
Japan	96.42	96.65	98.24	98.49
Kazakhstan	42.11	53.91	58.70	81.11
Kenya	42.34	74.66	81.57	79.20
Kyrgyzstan	3.76	18.47	39.94	45.09
Cambodia	3.66	22.17	21.67	33.39
South Korea	93.05	94.36	94.85	98.67
Kuwait	86.77	72.91	79.84	—
Laos	26.77	—	29.06	37.32
Lebanon	37.03	46.93	44.75	20.70
Liberia	18.80	—	35.71	51.63
Libya	—	—	65.67	—
Sri Lanka	68.53	82.69	73.65	89.27
Lesotho	18.50	—	45.56	63.63
Lithuania	73.76	77.91	82.88	93.53
Luxembourg	94.59	96.17	98.77	—
Latvia	89.66	90.22	93.22	96.62
Morocco	—	—	28.64	44.37
Moldova	18.07	17.76	43.79	64.25
Madagascar	5.52	8.55	17.87	26.30
Maldives	—	—	79.55	—
Mexico	27.43	39.14	36.93	48.97
North Macedonia	73.70	71.80	76.57	85.29
Mali	8.21	20.08	35.42	43.50
Malta	95.27	96.33	97.36	96.45
Myanmar	—	22.78	25.99	47.79
Montenegro	50.44	59.83	68.36	—
Mongolia	77.72	91.82	92.97	98.46
Mozambique	—	—	41.67	49.49
Mauritania	17.46	22.87	20.87	23.46
Mauritius	80.12	82.21	89.84	90.53
Malawi	16.54	18.09	33.71	42.71
Malaysia	66.17	80.67	85.34	88.37
Namibia	—	58.83	80.63	71.35
Niger	1.52	6.71	15.52	11.69
Nigeria	29.67	44.44	39.67	45.32
Nicaragua	14.22	19.44	30.86	26.03
Netherlands	98.66	99.30	99.64	99.73
Norway	—	100.00	99.75	99.48
Nepal	25.31	33.80	45.39	54.00
New Zealand	99.44	99.53	99.18	98.75
Oman	73.60	—	—	—
Pakistan	10.31	13.04	21.29	20.98
Panama	24.93	43.66	46.49	44.97
Peru	20.46	28.98	42.60	57.50
Philippines	26.56	31.29	34.50	51.37
Poland	70.19	77.86	86.73	95.72
Puerto Rico	—	69.74	—	—
Portugal	81.23	87.39	92.34	92.65
Paraguay	21.72	—	48.65	54.42
Palestine	19.43	24.24	25.02	33.64
Qatar	65.88	—	—	—
Romania	44.59	60.84	57.75	69.12
Russia	48.18	67.38	75.76	89.72
Rwanda	32.76	42.12	50.02	—
Saudi Arabia	46.42	69.41	71.70	74.32
Sudan	6.90	15.27	—	—
Senegal	5.82	15.42	42.34	55.96
Singapore	98.22	96.35	97.93	97.55
Sierra Leone	15.34	15.58	19.81	28.85
El Salvador	13.76	36.72	30.35	35.85
Somalia	—	38.66	—	—
Serbia	62.22	83.09	71.44	89.42
South Sudan	—	—	8.57	5.83
Slovakia	79.58	77.24	84.18	95.62
Slovenia	97.14	97.24	97.53	99.05
Sweden	98.99	99.72	99.74	99.69
Eswatini	28.57	—	—	66.18
Syria	23.25	—	—	—
Chad	8.96	12.43	21.76	23.65
Togo	10.19	18.25	45.29	49.61
Thailand	72.67	78.14	81.59	95.58
Tajikistan	2.53	11.46	47.02	39.49
Turkmenistan	0.40	—	40.58	—
Trinidad and Tobago	75.92	—	80.78	—
Tunisia	—	27.43	36.91	36.85
Turkey	57.60	56.68	68.59	74.09
Tanzania	17.26	39.78	46.75	52.43
Uganda	20.46	44.45	59.20	65.91
Ukraine	41.27	52.71	62.90	83.56
Uruguay	23.54	45.59	63.87	74.13
United States	87.96	93.58	93.12	94.95
Uzbekistan	22.50	40.71	37.09	44.13
Venezuela	44.12	57.03	73.49	84.39
Vietnam	21.37	30.95	30.80	56.27
Kosovo	44.31	47.80	52.27	58.01
Yemen	3.66	6.45	—	11.90
South Africa	53.65	70.32	69.22	85.38
Zambia	21.36	35.64	45.86	48.52
Zimbabwe	39.65	32.39	55.29	59.75
Low & middle income (WB)	41.66	54.99	62.98	71.38
Low-income (WB)	10.05	18.74	31.53	38.99
Middle-income (WB)	43.33	57.26	64.86	72.37
Lower middle income (WB)	30.45	43.70	58.27	62.38
Upper middle income (WB)	56.56	70.93	72.35	84.33
High-income (WB)	88.24	92.79	93.67	96.36
OECD	89.76	93.76	94.46	97.19
