= Financial services =

Economic service provided by the finance industry

Financial services are economic services tied to finance provided by financial institutions. Financial services encompass a broad range of service sector activities, especially as concerns financial management and consumer finance.

The terms finance industry and financial services industry in their most common sense concern commercial banks that provide market liquidity, risk instruments, and brokerage for large public companies and multinational corporations at a macroeconomic scale that impacts domestic politics and foreign relations. The extragovernmental power and scale of the finance industry remains an ongoing controversy in many industrialized Western economies, as seen in the American Occupy Wall Street civil protest movement of 2011.

Styles of financial institutions include credit union, bank, savings and loan association, trust company, building society, brokerage firm, payment processor, many types of broker, and some government-sponsored enterprise.

Financial services include accountancy, investment banking, investment management, and personal asset management, while financial products include insurance, credit cards, mortgage loans, and pension funds.

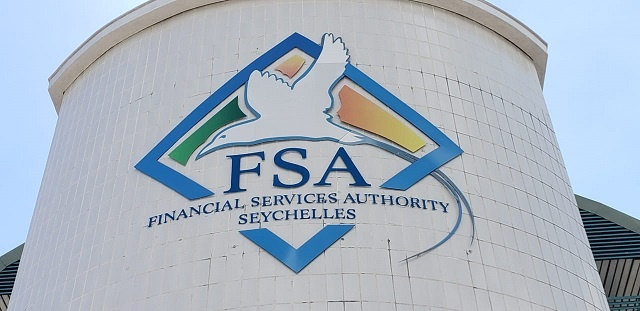
Seychelles Financial Services Authority logo on building

== History ==
Change in access to a financial account or services between 2005 and 2014 by country

The term "financial services" became more prevalent in the United States partly as a result of the Gramm–Leach–Bliley Act of the late 1990s, which enabled different types of companies operating in the U.S. financial services industry at that time to merge.

Companies usually have two distinct approaches to this new type of business. One approach would be a bank that simply buys an insurance company or an investment bank, keeps the original brands of the acquired firm, and adds the acquisition to its holding company simply to diversify its earnings. Outside the U.S. (e.g. Japan), non-financial services companies are permitted within the holding company. In this scenario, each company still looks independent and has its own customers, etc. In the other style, a bank would simply create its own insurance division or brokerage division and attempt to sell those products to its own existing customers, with incentives for combining all things with one company.

== Relationship to the government ==
The financial sector is traditionally among those to receive government support in times of widespread economic crisis. Such bailouts, however, enjoy less public support than those for other industries.

== Banks ==
=== Commercial banking services ===
A commercial bank is what is commonly referred to as simply a bank. The term "commercial" is used to distinguish it from an investment bank, a type of financial services entity which instead of lending money directly to a business, helps businesses raise money from other firms in the form of bonds (debt) or share capital (equity).

The primary operations of commercial banks include:

- Keeping money safe while also allowing withdrawals when needed
- Issuance of chequebooks so that bills can be paid and other kinds of payments can be delivered by the post
- Provide personal loans, commercial loans, and mortgage loans (typically loans to purchase a home, property or business)
- Issuance of credit cards, processing of credit card transactions and billing
- Issuance of debit cards for use as a substitute for cheques
- Allow financial transactions at branches or by using automatic teller machines (ATMs)
- Provide wire transfers of funds and electronic fund transfers between banks
- Facilitation of standing orders and direct debits, so payments for bills can be made automatically
- Provide overdraft agreements for the temporary advancement of the bank's own money to meet the monthly spending commitments of a customer in their current account.
- Provide internet banking system to facilitate customers to view and operate their respective accounts through the internet.
- Provide charge card advances of the bank's own money for customers wishing to settle credit advances monthly.
- Provide a check guaranteed by the bank itself and prepaid by the customer, such as a cashier's check or certified check.
- Notary service for financial and other documents
- Accepting deposits from customers and providing credit facilities to them.
- Sell investment products such as mutual funds.

The United States is the largest commercial banking services location.

=== Investment banking services ===
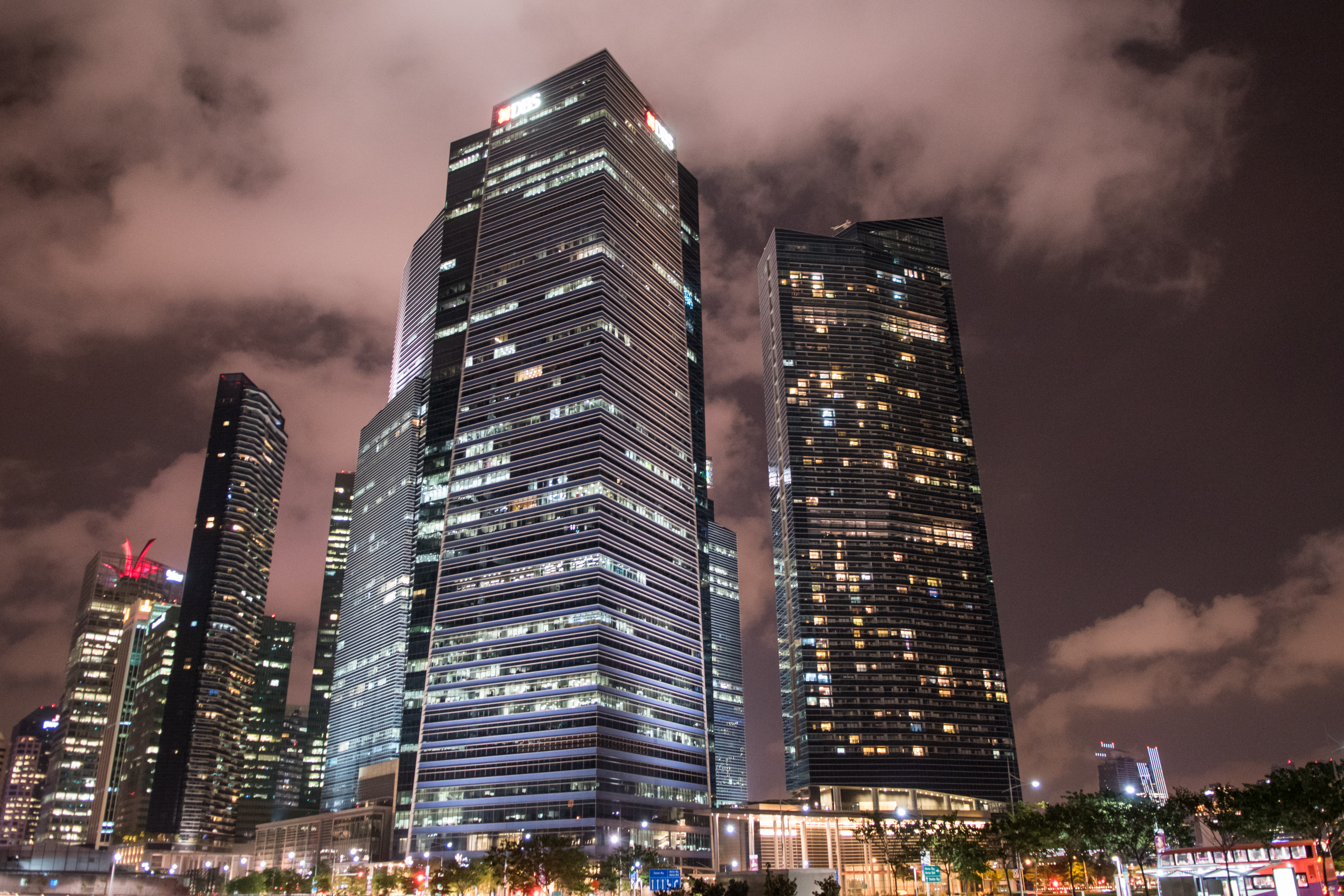
Singapore financial district by night (25449263528)

- Underwriting debt and equity for the private and public sector for such entities to raise capital.
- Mergers and acquisitions – Work to underwrite and advise companies on mergers or takeovers.
- Structured finance – Develop intricate (typically derivative) products for high net worth individuals and institutions with more intricate financial needs.
- Restructuring – Assist in financially reorganizing companies
- Investment management – Management of assets (e.g., real estate) to meet specified investment goals of clients.
- Securities research – Maintain their own department that services to assist their traders, clients and maintain a public stance on specific securities and industries.
- Broker Services – Buy and sell securities on behalf of their clients (sometimes may involve financial consulting as well).
- Prime brokerage – An exclusive type of bundled broker service specifically meant to service the needs of hedge funds.
- Private banking – Private banks provide banking services exclusively to high-net-worth individuals. Many financial services firms require a person or family to have a certain minimum net worth to qualify for private banking service.

New York City and London are the largest centers of investment banking services. NYC is dominated by U.S. domestic business, while in London international business and commerce make up a significant portion of investment banking activity.

== Foreign exchange services ==
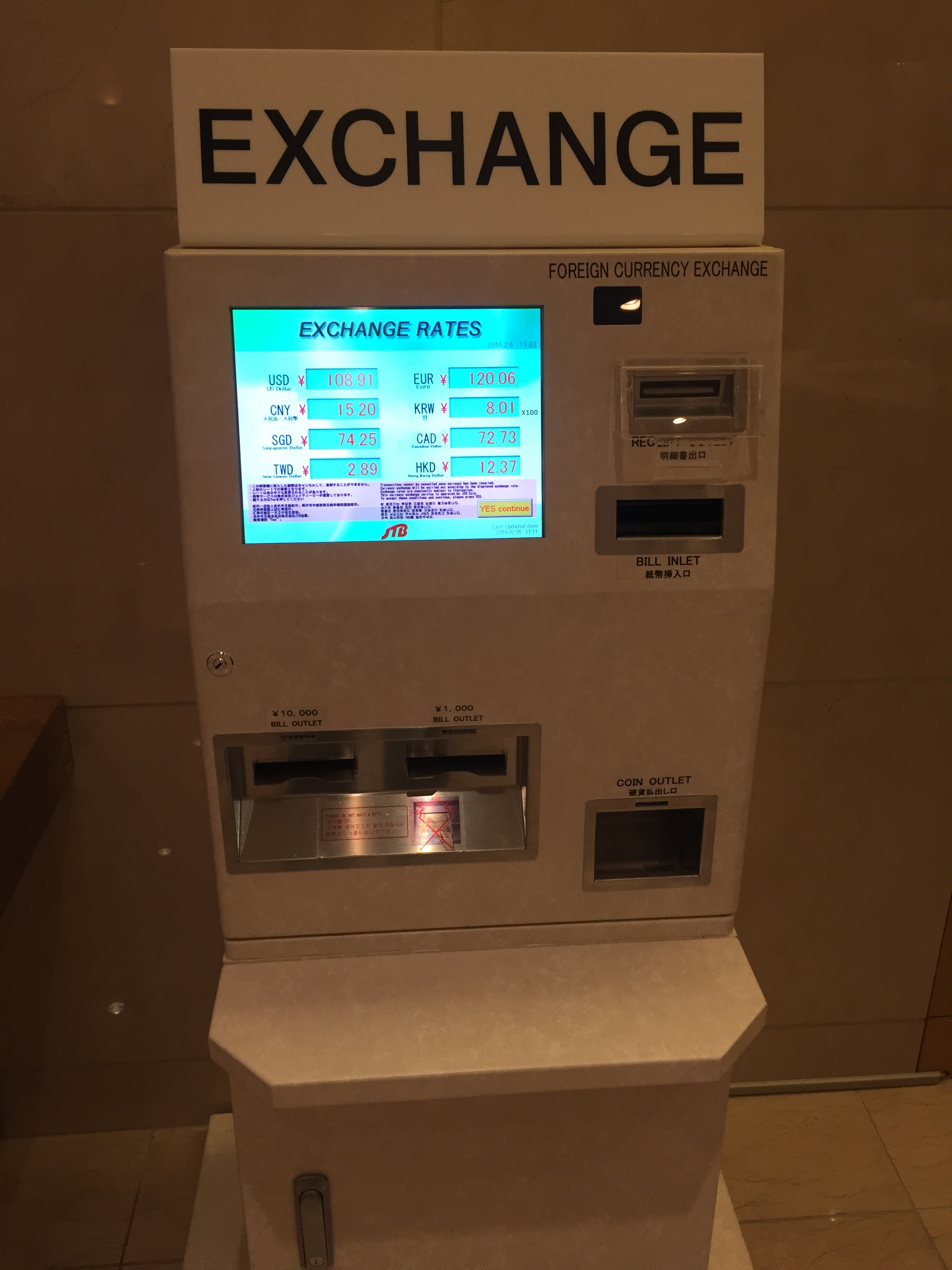
Foreign exchange machine

FX or Foreign exchange services are provided by many banks and specialists foreign exchange brokers around the world. Foreign exchange services include:

- Currency exchange – where clients can purchase and sell foreign currency banknotes.
- Wire transfer – where clients can send funds to international banks abroad.
- Remittance – where clients that are migrant workers send money back to their home country.

London handled 36.7% of global currency transactions in 2009 – an average daily turnover of US$1.85 trillion – with more US dollars traded in London than New York, and more euros traded than in every other city in Europe combined.

== Investment services ==
- Collective investment fund – A fund that acts as an investment pool so investors can put money into a fund that will reinvest it into a variety of securities based upon their common, outlined investment goal.
- Investment Advisory Offices – Run by registered investment advisors who advise clients in financial planning and invest their money.
- Hedge fund management – Hedge funds often employ the services of "prime brokerage" divisions at major investment banks to execute their trades.
- Private equity – Private equity funds are typically closed-end funds, which usually take controlling equity stakes in businesses that are either private or taken private once acquired. Private equity funds often use leveraged buyouts (LBOs) to acquire the firms in which they invest. The most successful private equity funds can generate returns significantly higher than provided by the equity markets.
- Venture capital – Private equity capital typically provided by professional, outside investors to new, high-growth-potential companies in the interest of taking the company to an IPO or trade sale of the business. Startup companies are typically fueled by an angel investor.
- Family office – Investment and wealth management firm that handles a wealthy family or small group of wealthy individuals with financial plans tailored to their needs. Similar to private banking.
- Advisory services – These firms (or departments within a larger entity) service clients with financial advisers who serve as both, a broker as well as a financial consultant.
- Custody services – the safe-keeping and processing of the world's securities trades and servicing the associated portfolios. Assets under custody in the world are approximately US$100 trillion.

New York City is the largest center of investment services, followed by London.

== Insurance ==
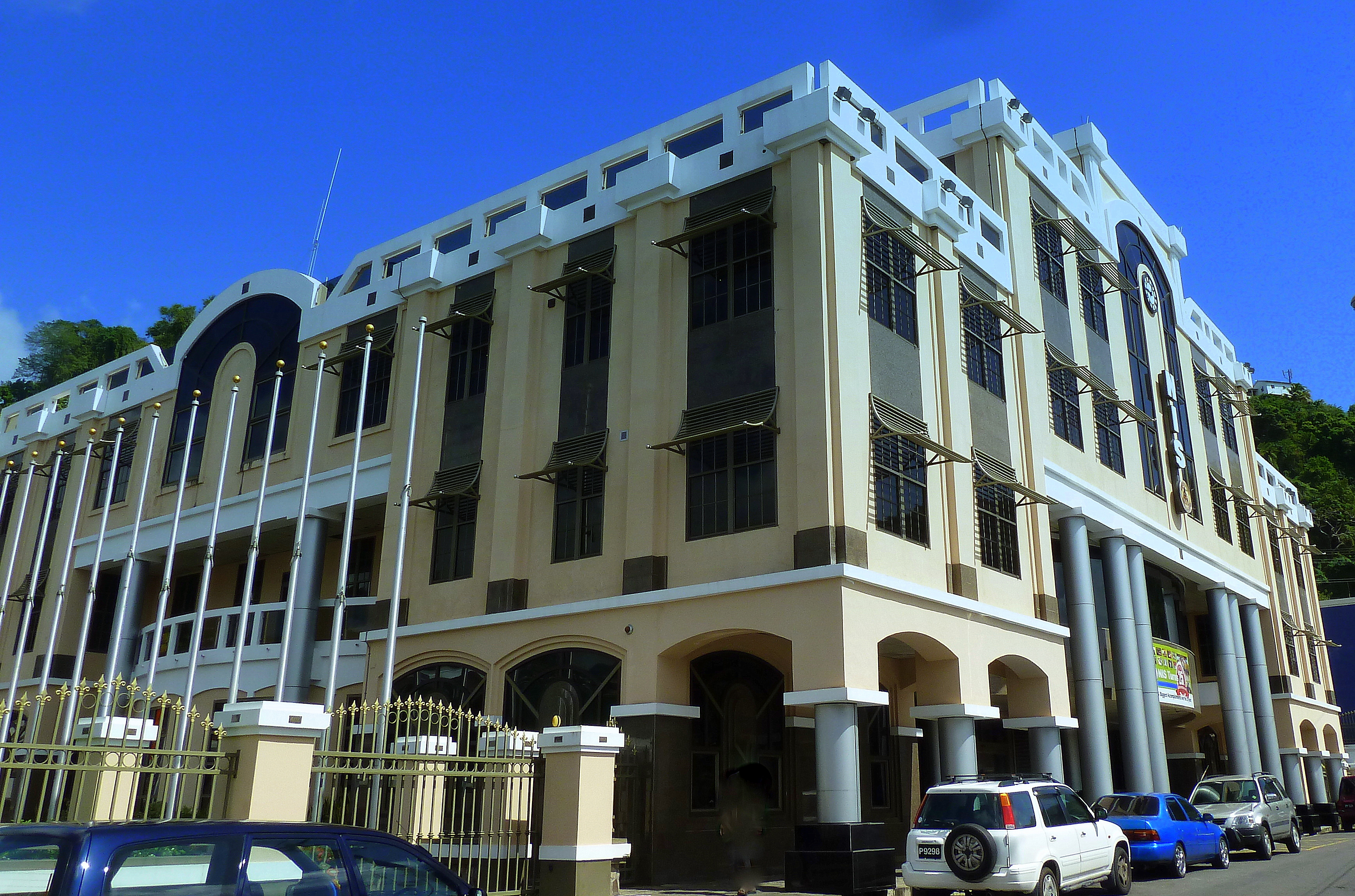
National Insurance Services (NIS) building in St. Vincent & the Grenadines

- Insurance brokerage – Insurance brokers shop for insurance (generally corporate property and casualty insurance) on behalf of customers. Recently several websites have been created to give consumers basic price comparisons for services such as insurance, causing controversy within the industry.
- Insurance underwriting – Personal lines insurance underwriters actually underwrite insurance for individuals, a service still offered primarily through agents, insurance brokers, and stock brokers. Underwriters may also offer similar commercial lines of coverage for businesses. Activities include insurance and annuities, life insurance, retirement insurance, health insurance, and property insurance and casualty insurance.
- Finance and insurance – a service still offered primarily at asset dealerships. The F&I manager encompasses the financing and insuring of the asset which is sold by the dealer. F&I is often called "the second gross" in dealerships that have adopted the model
- Reinsurance – Reinsurance is insurance sold to insurers themselves, to protect them from catastrophic losses.

The United States, followed by Japan and the United Kingdom are the largest insurance markets in the world.

== Other financial services ==
- Angel investment networks – A group of angel investors can create their own network to be the financial foundation for future companies.
- Credit card networking – Companies that serve as the bridge between the retailers and the banks who issue the bank cards. Major credit card networks are: UnionPay, Mastercard, Visa Inc., Rupay, American Express and Discover Card.
- Market maker - Company that quotes both buy and sell prices in tradable assets in order to create liquidity within the marketplace.
- Conglomerates – A financial services company, such as a universal bank, that is active in more than one sector of the financial services market e.g. life insurance, general insurance, health insurance, asset management, retail banking, wholesale banking, investment banking, etc. A key rationale for the existence of such businesses is the existence of diversification benefits that are present when different types of businesses are aggregated. As a consequence, economic capital for a conglomerate is usually substantially less than economic capital is for the sum of its parts.
- Debt resolution – A consumer service that assists individuals that have too much debt to pay off as requested, but do not want to file bankruptcy and wish to pay off their debts owed. This debt can be accrued in various ways including but not limited to personal loans, credit cards, or in some cases merchant accounts.
- Financial market utilities – Organizations that are part of the infrastructure of financial services, such as stock exchanges, clearing houses, derivative and commodity exchanges and payment systems such as real-time gross settlement systems or interbank networks.
- Payment recovery – Assistance in recovering money inadvertently paid to vendors by businesses, such as by accidental duplicate payment of an invoice or failure to return a deposit.

== Financial exports ==
A financial export is a financial service provided by a domestic firm (regardless of ownership) to a foreign firm or individual. While financial services such as banking, insurance, and investment management are often seen as domestic services, an increasing proportion of financial services are now being handled abroad, in other financial centres, for a variety of reasons. Some smaller financial centres, such as Bermuda, Luxembourg, and the Cayman Islands, lack sufficient size for a domestic financial services sector and have developed a role providing services to non-residents as offshore financial centres. The increasing competitiveness of financial services has meant that some countries, such as Japan, which were once self-sufficient, have increasingly imported financial services.

The leading financial exporter, in terms of exports less imports, is the United Kingdom, which had $95 billion of financial exports in 2014. The UK's position is helped by both unique institutions (such as Lloyd's of London for insurance, the Baltic Exchange for shipping etc.) and an environment that attracts foreign firms; many international corporations have global or regional headquarters in the London and are listed on the London Stock Exchange, and many banks and other financial institutions operate there or in Edinburgh.

== See also ==
- Alternative financial service
- Financial analyst
- Financial crime
- Financial accounting
- Financial technology
- Financialization
- Insider threat
- International Monetary Fund
- List of countries by share of population with access to financial services
- List of largest financial services companies by revenue
- Payment card industry
- Valuation (finance) § Valuing financial services firms
