= Foreign exchange company =

Company offering international payments and currency exchange

A non-bank foreign exchange company also known as foreign exchange broker or simply forex broker is a company that offers currency exchange and international payments to private individuals and companies. The term is typically used for currency exchange companies that offer physical delivery rather than speculative trading. i.e. there is a physical delivery of currency to a bank account.

Foreign exchange companies are normally distinct from money transfer companies or remittance companies and bureaux de change as they typically perform high-value transfers unlike their money transfer counterparts that focus on high-volume low-value transfers generally by economic migrants back to their home country or to provide cash for travelers. The transactions offered by foreign exchange companies are usually either spot transactions or forward transactions.

Some foreign exchange companies, such as Moneycorp and Global Reach, offer foreign exchange options for business clients too. Given the increased regulation and capital requirements around foreign exchange products of this nature, the foreign exchange companies who offer these products do so through a separately regulated entity.

== Companies by country ==
=== India ===
Foreign exchange markets in India have shown a steady increase in volumes as a result of increasing levels of foreign trade, driven by improvements in the communications systems and greater access to the international exchange markets.

The volume of transactions in these markets amounts to around USD 2 billion.

Around 25% of currency transfers/payments in India are made via non-bank Foreign Exchange Companies. Most of these companies use the USP of better exchange rates than the banks. They are regulated by the Foreign Exchange Dealer's Association of India (FEDAI) and any transaction in foreign exchange is governed by the Foreign Exchange Management Act (FEMA) 1999.

=== Australia ===
The Australian foreign exchange market has grown considerably to be the highly liquid, globally integrated market that it is today. The foreign exchange market in Australia is regulated by the Australian Securities and Investments Commission (ASIC). In 2022, the local market was the eleventh largest in the world and the AUD/USD was the sixth most traded currency pair globally.

=== United Kingdom ===
The UK non-bank foreign exchange market is one of the most advanced and competitive around the world. In 2006, it was estimated that 14% of currency transfers/international payments processed in the UK were made via non-bank Foreign Exchange Companies. In 2016, the share of Britain’s biggest banks in the market supplying UK companies' daily foreign currency needs fell for a second year running. The biggest non-bank provider in the UK was U.S.-headquartered Western Union whose market share rose to 3.4 percent from 3.0 percent.

UK foreign exchange companies are regulated by the Financial Conduct Authority (FCA). They are usually authorised by the FCA as either an Electronic Money Institution or Authorised Payment Institution.

The selling points of UK foreign exchange companies are usually price and service. For individuals and SMEs, they will usually offer better exchange rates and cheaper payment fees than a customer's bank. Many foreign exchange companies will provide clients with a dedicated account manager too. Something that is generally not possible for individuals and SMEs with a bank.

Recently reported net profit/loss of well-known UK originated foreign exchange companies (taken from companies house):

Company	Accounting Date	Pre Tax Net Profit/Loss
AFEX	31 December 2020	£487,815
Currencies Direct Ltd	30 June 2020	£9,037,000
Currency Solutions	31 March 2020	£144,559
Foreign Currency Direct	31 October 2020	(£3,105,409)
Global Reach Group	31 December 2019	(£4,036,000)
Halo Financial	31 March 2020	(£237,887)
HiFX (XE Money Transfer)	31 October 2020	£1,387,000
Moneycorp (Note: TTT Moneycorp Limited also has High Street and airport/station Bureaux de Change included in this total.)	31 December 2019	(£5,428,000)
TorFX	30 June 2020	£15,015,000
WorldFirst UK Ltd	31 December 2019	(£44,477,000)

=== United Arab Emirates ===
As per the world bank report, the money exchange business in the UAE has shown steady growth in 2014 as remittances rose nearly five per cent to $29 billion. Most of the GCC states have announced major plans for converting their countries into world-class business hubs. This will further enhance exchange business in the region.the money transfer business in the UAE continued to grow last year as exchange companies reported up to 10 to 15 per cent increase in transactions in 2014 compared to the previous year. New development around the UAE is also set to give a boost to the tourism sector, which would, in turn, increase demand for currency exchange services

Two major Foreign Exchange companies in UAE

- UAE Exchange
- GCC Exchange

=== Singapore ===
In Singapore, foreign exchange companies are governed by the Monetary Authority of Singapore under the Money-Changing and Remittance Businesses Act which sets out the criteria for license application as well as guidelines when it comes to the prevention of money laundering and countering the financing of terrorism. As of June 2019, there are 391 money changing businesses and 114 remittance companies in Singapore.

== See also ==
- Foreign exchange market
- Remittance
- Bureau de change
