= Outline of finance =

Overview of finance and finance-related topics

The following outline provides an overview and topical guide to finance:

Finance – the field concerned with how individuals, businesses, and organizations raise, allocate, and manage monetary resources over time, while accounting for the risks associated with their activities and investments.

== Overview ==
The term finance may incorporate any of the following:

- The study of money and other assets
- The management and control of those assets
- Profiling and managing related risks

== Fundamental financial concepts ==
- Finance – Academic discipline studying businesses and investments
  - Arbitrage – Capitalisation of risk-free opportunities in financial markets
  - Capital (economics) – Already-produced durable goods that are used in production of goods or services
  - Capital asset pricing model – Finance model linking expected return to systematic risk
  - Cash flow – Movement of money into or out of a business, project, or financial product
  - Cash flow matching – Strategy aligning asset cash inflows with liability outflows
  - Debt – Obligation to pay borrowed money
    - Default – Financial failure to meet legal conditions of a loan
    - Consumer debt – Amount owed by individual consumers
    - Debt consolidation – Form of debt refinancing
    - Debt settlement – Settlement negotiated with a debtor's unsecured creditor
    - Credit counseling – Process to help debtors
    - Bankruptcy – Legal status for relief from debts
    - Debt diet – Debt management plan
    - Debt-snowball method – Personal finance strategy
    - Debt of developing countries
  - Financial ethics – Application of ethical principles to the area of business activities
  - Asset types
    - Real estate – Land, including its buildings and resources
    - Securities – Tradable financial asset
    - Commodities – Fungible item produced to satisfy wants or needs
    - Futures – Standardised contract to buy or sell an asset at a future date
    - Cash – Physical currency and other immediately accessible liquid assets
  - Discounted cash flow – Method of valuing a project, company, or asset
  - Financial capital – Economic resources used to buy what is needed to make products or provide services
    - Funding – Act of providing resources
  - Entrepreneur – Person who owns and operates a business
    - Entrepreneurship – Taking financial risks in the hope of profit
  - Fixed income analysis – Process of valuing debt securities by assessing their risk and return
  - Gap financing – Short-term loan covering the gap between available funds and total financing needs
  - Global financial system – Global framework for capital flows
  - Hedge – Investment position used to offset potential losses in another asset
    - Basis risk – Risk that a hedge and its underlying asset do not move perfectly together
  - Interest rate – Percentage of a sum of money charged for its use
    - Risk-free interest rate – Interest rate for zero risk investment
    - Term structure of interest rates – Relationships among bond yields of different maturities
  - Short-rate model – Interest-rate model describing the stochastic evolution of the instantaneous short rate
    - Vasicek model – Mathematical model of interest rates
    - Cox–Ingersoll–Ross model – Stochastic model for the evolution of financial interest rates
    - Hull–White model – Model of future interest rates
    - Chen model – Three-factor short-rate model for interest-rate dynamics
    - Black–Derman–Toy model – Short-rate model in mathematical finance
  - Interest
    - Effective interest rate – Precisely defined interest rate
    - Nominal interest rate – Interest rate without adjusting for inflation
    - Interest rate basis – Calculation method for the accrual of interest
    - Fisher equation – Estimate of future interest rates
    - Crowding out – Reduction in private investment caused by increased government borrowing
    - Annual percentage rate – Interest rate for a whole year
    - Interest coverage ratio, also known as Times interest earned – Ratio measuring a firm's ability to meet its interest payments
  - Investment – Set of actions with the intent of earning profit
    - Foreign direct investment – Cross-border investment giving a foreign investor lasting control of an enterprise
    - Gold as an investment – Use of gold as a store of value and investment asset
    - Over-investing – Investing more in an asset than its market value justifies
  - Leverage – Use of borrowed funds in the purchase of an asset
  - Long (finance) – Position in a financial instrument in which the holder owns a positive amount
  - Liquidity
    - Market liquidity – Finance property of an asset
    - Accounting liquidity – Measure of a debtor's ability to pay their debts as/when they mature
    - Funding liquidity – Ability of a financial institution to meet its payment obligations when due
  - Margin (finance) – Type of financial collateral used to cover credit risk
  - Mark to market – Accounting method valuing assets and liabilities at current market prices
  - Market impact – Concept in economics
  - Medium of exchange – Method by which value is transferred between parties
  - Microcredit – Small loans to impoverished borrowers
  - Money – Object or record accepted as payment
    - Money creation – Process by which the money supply of an economic region is increased
    - Currency – Standardization of money
    - Coin – Small, flat and usually round piece of material used as money
    - Banknote – Paper money issued by a bank
    - Counterfeit – Making a copy or imitation which is represented as the original
    - History of money
    - Monetary reform – Movements to amend the financial system
  - Portfolio – Financial term for a collection of investments
    - Modern portfolio theory – Mathematical framework for investment risk
    - Mutual fund separation theorem – Theorem in portfolio theory
    - Post-modern portfolio theory – Portfolio theory
  - Reference rate – Benchmark interest rate used to price loans and financial contracts
  - Return – Finance term; profit on an investment
    - Absolute return – One measure of the return of an investment portfolio
    - Investment performance
    - Relative return – Measure of the return on an investment
  - Risk – Possibility of something bad happening
    - Financial risk – Any of various types of risk associated with financing
    - Risk management – Identification, evaluation and control of risks
      - Financial risk management – Protecting economic value by managing risk exposure
      - Uncompensated risk – In investments, level of additional risk
    - Risk measure – Concept in financial mathematics
      - Coherent risk measure – Concept in financial economics
      - Deviation risk measure – Risk metric quantifying variability of returns around their expected value
      - Distortion risk measure – Risk measure derived by applying a distortion function to a loss distribution
      - Spectral risk measure – Coherent risk measure using weighted outcomes based on risk aversion
      - Value at risk – Estimated potential loss for an investment under a given set of conditions
        - Expected shortfall – Risk measure estimating the average loss in the worst tail of the distribution
        - Entropic value at risk – Coherent measure for value at risk
  - Scenario analysis – Futures studies / Futures techniques method
  - Short (finance) – Selling unowned financial securities
  - Speculation – Engaging in risky financial transactions
    - Day trading – Buying and selling financial instruments within the same trading day
  - Position trader – Standardised contract to buy or sell an asset at a future date
  - Spread trade – Type of financial purchase on securities
  - Standard of deferred payment – Debt valuation in economics
  - Store of value – Inflation-resistant asset
  - Time horizon, also known as planning horizon – Planned duration over which an investment or decision is expected to be held
  - Time value of money – Better to receive money now than later
    - Discounting – When a creditor delays payments from a debtor in exchange for a fee
    - Present value (PV), also known as Present Discounted Value (PDV) – Current worth of a future sum discounted to today
    - Future value – Value of an asset at a specific date
    - Net present value – Valuation in finance
    - Internal rate of return – Method of calculating an investment's rate of return
    - Modified internal rate of return – Measure of an investment's attractiveness
    - Annuity – Series of payments made at equal intervals
    - Perpetuity – Annuity with payments made at equal intervals indefinitely
  - Trade – Exchange of goods and services
    - Free trade – Absence of government restriction on international trade
    - Free market – Form of market-based economy
    - Fair trade – Sustainable and equitable trade
  - Unit of account – Standard numerical measure used to value and compare goods and services
  - Volatility – Degree of variation of a trading price series over time
  - Yield – Income return on an investment expressed as a percentage of its value
  - Yield curve – Relationships among bond yields of different maturities
  - Equated monthly installment – Loan repayment variant
  - Down payment – Upfront partial payment for the purchase of something expensive
- Financial technology

== History ==
- History of finance – Academic discipline studying businesses and investments
- History of banking – Development of banking institutions and practices from antiquity to the present
- History of insurance – Development of insurance practices and institutions from antiquity to the present
- Stock market bubble – Economic bubble in a stock market
  - Tulip mania – 17th-century economic bubble in the Netherlands
  - South Sea Bubble – 18th-century British company involved in a major financial scandal
  - Mississippi Company – French joint-stock company
  - Railway Mania – Speculative frenzy in the UK in the 1840s about railways
  - Dot-com bubble – Tech stock speculative craze, c. 1995–2003
  - United States housing bubble – Economic bubble
- Vix pervenit – 1745 encyclical by Pope Benedict XIV , on usury and other dishonest profit
- Panic of 1837 – 19th-century United States financial crisis
- Erie War – 19th-century Wall-Street battle for control of the Erie Railroad
- Long Depression – Worldwide economic recession from 1873 to 1879
- Post-World War I hyperinflation; see
  - Hyperinflation – Rapidly accelerating inflation
  - Inflation in the Weimar Republic – Period of extreme inflation in Germany (1921–1923)
- Wall Street Crash of 1929 – Major stock market crash in the United States
- Great Depression – Worldwide economic depression (1929–1939)
- Bretton Woods Accord – Financial-economic agreement reached in 1944
- 1973 oil crisis – OAPEC petroleum embargo
- 1979 energy crisis – Worldwide increase in crude oil prices following the Iranian Revolution
- Savings and Loan Crisis – US financial crisis from 1986 to 1995
- Black Monday – Global stock market crash
- 1997 Asian financial crisis – Regional financial crisis that struck East and Southeast Asia in 1997–1998
- Stock market downturn of 2002 – Downturn in international stock prices
- 2008 financial crisis – Worldwide economic crisis
- Great Recession – 2007–2009 international economic decline

== Finance terms by field ==
=== Accounting (financial record keeping) ===
- Auditing – Independent examination of an organization
- Accounting software – Computer program that maintains account books
- Bookkeeping – Recording financial transactions or events
- FASB – Private US organization for accounting
- Financial accountancy – Field of accounting
  - Financial statements – Formal record of financial activities
    - Balance sheet – Accounting financial summary
    - Cash flow statement – Financial statement
    - Income statement – Type of financial statement
- Management accounting – Field of business administration, part of the internal accounting system of a company
- Philosophy of accounting – Conceptual framework
- Hedge accounting – Accounting method aligning hedging gains and losses with the hedged item
  - IFRS 9 – Accounting standard
  - Fair value accounting – Accounting method valuing assets and liabilities at current market prices

=== Banking ===
- See articles listed under: Bank § See also

=== Corporate finance ===
- Below § Corporate finance theory
- Introduction to business: The most widely used and accessible textbook for Introduction to Business courses globally is "Introduction to Business" by OpenStax. Other popular standard textbooks include "Introduction to Business" by Jeff Madura and "Introduction to Business" by Neck, Neck, and Murray.
- Balance sheet analysis – Accounting financial summary
  - Financial ratio – Numerical value to determine the financial condition of a company
- Business plan – Formal written document containing the goals of a business
    - Investment committee – Head of investments in an organization
    - Business valuation – Determination of the economic value of a business
    - Stock valuation – Method of calculating theoretical values of companies and their stocks
    - Fundamental analysis – Analysis of a business's financial statements, health, and market
    - Real option – Capital budgeting analysis term
    - Valuation topics – Overview of finance and finance-related topics
    - Fisher separation theorem – Firm"s investment decision is independent of its owners' consumption preferences
  - Sources of financing – Mix of funds used to start and sustain a business
  - Securities – Tradable financial asset
  - Debt – Obligation to pay borrowed money
  - Initial public offering – Type of securities offering in which a private company goes public
  - Capital structure – Mix of funds used to start and sustain a business
  - Cost of capital – Cost of a company's funds
    - Weighted average cost of capital – Concept in economics
    - Modigliani–Miller theorem – Economic theory about capital structure
    - Hamada's equation – Corporate finance equation on separating risk
  - Dividend policy – Policies in finance
    - Dividend – Payment made by a corporation to its shareholders
    - Dividend tax – Tax levied on stock earnings
    - Dividend yield – Financial ratio of dividends to share price
    - Modigliani–Miller theorem – Economic theory about capital structure
- Corporate action – Event initiated by a public company
- (Strategic) Financial management
  - Capital management – Management of capital assets and investments
    - Capital budgeting – How an organization allocates its cash and resources
    - Working capital – Difference between a firm's assets and liabilities used to fund day-to-day operations
      - Current assets – Economic resource, from which future economic benefits are expected
      - Current liabilities – Liabilities of the business that are to be settled in cash
  - Managerial finance – Application of financial principles to managerial decision-making
  - Management accounting – Field of business administration, part of the internal accounting system of a company
- Mergers and acquisitions – Processes through which companies combine or transfer ownership
  - Leveraged buyout – Acquired control over a company by the purchase of its shares with borrowed money
  - Takeover – Purchase of a company by another company
  - Corporate raid – Company acquisition strategy
  - Contingent value rights – Buyer's rights in corporate finance
- Real option – Capital budgeting analysis term
  - Return on investment – Ratio between net income and investment
    - Return on capital – Measure of profitability relative to invested capital
    - Return on assets – Measure of how profitable a company's assets are in generating revenue
    - Return on equity – Measure of the profitability of a business
  - Loan covenant – Condition in a commercial loan or bond agreement
  - Cash conversion cycle – Length of time it takes a company to convert resource inputs to cash flows
  - Cash management – Measures of managing short-term cash in the company
    - Strategic financial management § Cash management
  - Inventory optimization – Business practice for improving location and size of inventory storage
    - Supply chain management – Management of the flow of goods and services
    - Just In Time (JIT) – Methodology used to improve production
    - Economic order quantity (EOQ), also known as Optimum Batch Quantity – Production scheduling model
    - Economic production quantity (EPQ) – Model in inventory management
    - Economic batch quantity – Model for determining the optimal production batch size
  - Credit (finance) – Financial term for the trust between parties in transactions with a deferred payment
  - Credit scoring – Numerical expression representing a person's creditworthiness
  - Default risk – Risk that a borrower or counterparty fails to meet financial obligations
  - Discounts and allowances – Reductions applied to the basic sale price of goods or services
  - Factoring (trade) – Financial transaction and a type of debtor finance
  - Supply chain finance, also known as supplier finance or reverse factoring – Financing methods that optimize cash flow across buyer–supplier relationships
  - Corporate budget – Balance sheet or statement of estimated receipts and expenditures

=== Investment management ===
- Active management – Investment approach where managers actively select and adjust portfolio holdings
- Efficient-market hypothesis – Economic theory that asset prices fully reflect all available information
- Portfolio – Financial term for a collection of investments
- Modern portfolio theory – Mathematical framework for investment risk
  - Capital asset pricing model – Finance model linking expected return to systematic risk
- Arbitrage pricing theory – Asset pricing theory
- Passive management – Market-weighted investing strategy
  - Index fund – Type of mutual fund or exchange-traded fund
- Activist shareholder – Shareholder using equity to pressure management
- Mutual fund – Professionally managed investment fund
  - Open-end fund – Collective investment scheme
  - Closed-end fund – Professionally managed investment fund
- Financial engineering – Application of mathematical and computational practices in finance
  - Long-Term Capital Management – Defunct American hedge fund
- Hedge fund – Privately pooled investment fund using diverse strategies to seek high returns
- Hedge – Investment position used to offset potential losses in another asset
- Quantitative investing – Use of mathematical and statistical methods in finance

=== Personal finance ===
- 529 plan – United States savings program for educational expenses
- ABLE account – U.S. savings program for individuals with disabilities
- Asset allocation – Investment strategy
  - Asset location
- Budget – Balance sheet or statement of estimated receipts and expenditures
- Coverdell Education Savings Account – US tax advantaged investment account
- Credit and debt
  - Credit card – Card for financial transactions on credit
  - Debt consolidation – Form of debt refinancing
  - Mortgage loan – Loan secured using real estate
    - Continuous-repayment mortgage – Mortgage repaid through continuous or near-continuous amortisation
- Debit card – Card used for financial transactions
- Direct deposit – Deposit of money by a payer into a payee's account
- Employment contract – Kind of contract in labour law
  - Commission – Form of variable-pay remuneration for services rendered or products sold
  - Employee stock option – Option for employee to share in company stock
  - Employee or fringe benefit – Non-wage compensation provided to employees in addition to normal wages or salaries
  - Health insurance – Insurance covering health-related expenses
  - Paycheck – Record of money paid or due to employees
  - Salary – Form of periodic payment from an employer to an employee
  - Wage – Payment by an employer to an employee for labour
- Financial literacy – Ability to make informed choices about money
- Insurance – Protection from financial loss
- Predatory lending – Unethical lending practices
- Retirement plan – Retirement fund
  - Superannuation in Australia – Retirement pension benefit funds
  - Canada
    - Registered retirement savings plan – Canadian financial account for savings and investment assets
    - Tax-free savings account – Registered tax free savings plan for Canadians
  - Nippon individual savings account – Japanese retail investment account
  - KiwiSaver – New Zealand savings scheme
  - United Kingdom
    - Individual savings account – Class of retail investment arrangement
    - Self-invested personal pension – Type of UK government-approved personal pension scheme
  - United States
    - 401(a) – Tax-deferred retirement savings plan
    - 401(k) – Type of U.S. retirement/pension plan
    - 403(b) – Type of retirement/pension plan in the United States
    - 457 plan – Type of retirement plan in the United States
    - Keogh plan – Type of pension plan in the U.S
    - Individual retirement account – Form of individual retirement plan
      - Roth IRA – Individual retirement account
      - Traditional IRA – Type of individual retirement arrangement
      - SEP IRA – Type of retirement pension account used in the United States
      - SIMPLE IRA – Type of retirement plan in United States
  - Pension – Retirement fund
- Simple living – Simplified, minimalistic lifestyle
- Social security – Means-oriented social benefit
- Tax advantage – Financial incentive
- Wealth – Abundance of financial assets or possessions
- Comparison of accounting software
- Personal financial management – Managing ones own personal finances
- Investment club – Group of people who pool their money to make investments
- Collective investment scheme – Way of investing money alongside other investors

=== Public finance ===
- Central bank – Government body that manages currency and monetary policy
- Federal Reserve – Central banking system of the US
- Fractional-reserve banking – Banking system where institutions hold only a fraction of deposits as reserves
  - Deposit creation multiplier – Process by which the money supply of an economic region is increased
- Tax – Compulsory contribution to state revenue
  - Capital gains tax – Tax on investment profits
  - Estate tax – Tax paid after inheritance of property
  - inheritance tax – Tax paid after inheritance of property
  - Gift tax – Tax on money or property that one living person gives to another
  - Income tax – Tax based on taxable income
  - Inheritance tax – Tax paid after inheritance of property
  - Payroll tax – Tax imposed on employers or employees
  - Property tax – Tax on property, particularly real estate
  - land value tax – Levy on the unimproved value of land
  - Sales tax – Tax on the sales of certain goods and services
  - value added tax – Form of consumption tax
  - excise tax – Goods tax levied at the moment of manufacture rather than sale
  - use tax – Type of tax in the United States
  - Transfer tax – Tax on the transfer of property or assets between parties
  - stamp duty – Tax levied on property purchases or documents
  - Tax advantage – Financial incentive
  - Tax, tariff and trade – Compulsory contribution to state revenue
  - Tax amortization benefit – Savings resulting from amortization
- Crowding out – Reduction in private investment caused by increased government borrowing
- Industrial policy – Government strategy promoting industrial development
- Agricultural policy – Laws relating to domestic agriculture and foreign-imported agricultural products
- Currency union – Agreement involving states sharing a single currency
- Monetary reform – Movements to amend the financial system

=== Risk management ===
- Asset and liability management – Framework for managing risks arising from mismatches between assets and liabilities
- Asset–liability mismatch – Mismatch between the timing or sensitivity of a firm's assets and liabilities
- Capital Requirements Regulation 2013 – EU banking law
- Credit Institutions Directive 2013
- Capital Requirements Directives – EU prudential capital and supervision rules for banks and investment firms
- Cash flow hedge – Accounting method aligning hedging gains and losses with the hedged item
- Cash management – Measures of managing short-term cash in the company
- Corporate governance – Mechanisms, processes and relations by which corporations are controlled and operated
- Climate-related asset stranding – Former physical asset, now a liability
- Credit risk – Risk that a borrower or counterparty fails to meet financial obligations
- Default (finance) – Financial failure to meet legal conditions of a loan
- Discounted maximum loss – Measure of worst-case loss discounted to present value
- Downside risk – Risk of the actual return being below the expected return
- Upside risk
- Duration gap – Financial institutions duration gap
- Enterprise risk management – Business methods and processes
- Financial engineering – Application of mathematical and computational practices in finance
- Financial risk – Any of various types of risk associated with financing
- Financial risk management – Protecting economic value by managing risk exposure
- Foreign exchange hedge – Method used to eliminate foreign exchange risk
- Fuel price risk management – Strategies used to reduce financial exposure to fuel-price volatility
- Gordon–Loeb model – Method for optimizing information security investments
- Interest rate risk – Financial loss due to interest rate changes
  - Interest rate risk in the banking book – Banking regulation framework
- Insurance – Protection from financial loss
- Investment risk – Any of various types of risk associated with financing
- Irrational exuberance – Unfounded market optimism that lacks fundamental valuation
- Kelly criterion – Bet sizing formula for long-term growth
- Liquidity risk – Type of financial risk
- Market risk – Risks arising from movements in market variables
- Operational risk – Risk of disrupting business operations
- Risk accounting – Extensive subject of Management accounting
- Risk adjusted return on capital – Profitability measurement framework
- Risk aversion – Economics theory
- Risk-based internal audit – Internal audit approach that prioritises areas with higher organisational risk
- Risk measure – Concept in financial mathematics
  - Coherent risk measure – Concept in financial economics
  - Deviation risk measure – Risk metric quantifying variability of returns around their expected value
  - Distortion risk measure – Risk measure derived by applying a distortion function to a loss distribution
  - Spectral risk measure – Coherent risk measure using weighted outcomes based on risk aversion
- Risk modeling – Modelling financial risks
- Risk of ruin – Concept in gambling, insurance, and finance
- Risk pool – Insurance risk management sharing liability
- Risk register – Document used as risk management tool, acting as a repository for all identified risks
- Risk return ratio – Mathematical ratio used in investing
- Risk–return spectrum – Tradeoff between investment return and risk
- Security management – Computer security procedure
- Settlement risk – Risk that a party fails to deliver
- Shadow banking system – Non-banks that provide services similar to banks
- Specific risk – Risk affecting a particular asset or company, reducible through diversification
- St. Petersburg paradox – Paradox involving a game with repeated coin flipping
- Systematic risk – Vulnerability to significant events that affect aggregate outcomes
- Three lines of defence – Independent, objective assurance and consulting activity
- Treasury management – Management of an enterprise's holdings and liquidity to mitigate risk
- Uncompensated risk – In investments, level of additional risk
- Valuation risk – Risk that financial assets are misstated due to uncertain or unreliable valuations
- Value at risk – Estimated potential loss for an investment under a given set of conditions
  - Computation
    - Historical simulation (finance) – Risk-measurement method that estimates losses using past market data
    - Monte Carlo – Probabilistic measurement methods
    - variance-covariance – Estimated potential loss for an investment under a given set of conditions
    - Greeks (finance) – Model parameters in mathematical finance
  - Alternate measures
    - Entropic value at risk – Coherent measure for value at risk
    - Expected shortfall, also known as Conditional value-at-risk – Risk measure estimating the average loss in the worst tail of the distribution
    - Tail value at risk (TVaR), also known as Tail Conditional Expectation – Risk measure estimating the average loss in the worst tail of the distribution
  - Extensions
    - Profit at risk – Measure estimating the potential decline in profit under adverse market conditions
    - Margin at risk – Measure estimating potential margin shortfalls under adverse market moves
    - Liquidity at risk – Measure of potential liquidity shortfall in a financial portfolio
    - Earnings at risk (EaR), also known as Cash flow at risk – Estimate of the potential impact of market movements on a firm's earnings
    - Liquidity-adjusted VaR – Type of financial risk
- Volatility risk – Risk arising from changes in market volatility affecting the value of financial positions
- Volume risk – Risk that changes in transaction or production volumes will affect financial outcomes
- Wrong way risk – Risk that exposure to a counterparty increases as their credit quality deteriorates

=== Constraint finance ===
- Environmental finance – Field of finance focused on environmental policy
- Feminist economics – Gender-aware branch of economics
- Green economics – Economy based on ecological economics
- Islamic economics – Handling of economics based on Islamic jurisprudence
- Uneconomic growth – Economic growth that reflects or creates a decline in the quality of life
- Value of Earth – Economical estimate of the net worth of the planet
- Value of life – Economic measure placing a monetary value on reducing the risk of death

== Insurance ==
- Actuarial science – Statistics applied to risk in insurance and other financial products
- Annuities – Series of payments at fixed intervals
- Catastrophe modeling – Computer-assisted risk analysis
- Earthquake loss – Form of property insurance
- Extended coverage – Insurance for additional risks
- Financial risk management § Insurance
- Insurable interest – Legal requirement that a policyholder would suffer a loss from the insured event
- Insurable risk – Conditions under which a risk can be covered by insurance
- Insurance – Protection from financial loss
  - Health insurance – Insurance covering health-related expenses
    - Disability insurance – Insurance providing income protection when a disability prevents a person from working
    - Accident insurance – Insurance that pays benefits for injuries or death caused by accidental events
    - Flexible spending account – Tax-advantaged financial accounts in the US
    - Health savings account – American tax-advantaged medical savings account
    - Long term care insurance – Insurance which pays monthly for nursing home or assisted-living care
    - Medical savings account – Bank holding limiting deposit use to health expenses
  - Life insurance – Insurance that pays benefits upon the policyholder's death
    - Life insurance tax shelter – Use of life insurance to defer or reduce taxes
    - Term life insurance – Life insurance providing coverage for a fixed period with no cash-value component
    - Universal life insurance – Cash value life insurance in the US
    - Variable universal life insurance – Life insurance combining flexible premiums with investment-linked cash-value accounts
    - Whole life insurance – Permanent life insurance with fixed premiums and guaranteed cash-value accumulation
  - Property insurance – Insurance that protects against most risks to property
    - Auto insurance – Insurance for road vehicles
    - Boiler insurance – Insurance covering boilers
    - Business interruption insurance – Insurance that covers lost income when normal business operations are disrupted
    - Earthquake insurance – Form of property insurance
    - Home insurance, also known as Condo insurance – Type of property insurance that covers a private residence
    - Title insurance – Form of indemnity insurance
    - Pet insurance – Insurance that reimburses veterinary costs
    - Renters' insurance – Insurance policy for a tenant's personal property and liability
  - Casualty insurance – Insurance not directly concerned with life, health, or property insurance
    - Fidelity bond – Insurance against others' frauds
    - Liability insurance – Insurance that covers legal liability for injury, damage, or loss caused to others
    - Political risk insurance – Insurance that protects investments against losses from political or sovereign actions
    - War risk insurance – Insurance that covers losses arising from war, terrorism, or other hostile acts
    - Surety bond – Promise to assume responsibility for defaulted debt
    - Terrorism insurance – Financial coverage against terrorist attacks
  - Credit insurance
    - Trade credit insurance – Insurance protecting businesses against losses from customer non-payment of trade debts
    - Payment protection insurance – Covers loan repayments if borrower cannot pay due to illness, unemployment, or death
    - Credit derivative – Financial contract that transfers the credit risk of a borrower between parties
  - Mid-term adjustment – Change to an insurance policy's terms, cover, or premium made during the policy period
  - Reinsurance – Insurance purchased by an insurance company
  - Self insurance – Bearing risk that is usually outsourced
  - Travel insurance – Insurance that covers financial losses from events during travel
  - Niche insurance – Insurance for small, low-demand areas
- Insurance contract – Contract between the insurer and the insured
- Loss payee clause – Clause directing insurance claim payments to a third-party interest
- Risk Retention Group – Member-owned US liability insurance group formed under the Liability Risk Retention Act

== Economics and finance ==
=== Finance-related areas of economics ===
- Financial economics – Academic discipline concerned with the exchange of money
- Financial econometrics – Method to financial market data
- Monetary economics – Branch of economics covering theories of money
- Mathematical economics – Branch of applied mathematics
- Managerial economics – Application of economics in a business
- Economic growth – Measure of increase in market value of goods
- Decision theory – Branch of applied probability theory
- Game theory – Mathematical models of strategic interactions
- Experimental economics – Method used to study economic questions
- Experimental finance – Field using controlled experiments to study financial behaviour and market dynamics
- Behavioral economics – Factors influencing economic decisions
- Behavioral finance – How psychological biases shape investor behaviour and financial markets

=== Corporate finance theory ===
- Fisher separation theorem – Firm"s investment decision is independent of its owners' consumption preferences
- Modigliani–Miller theorem – Economic theory about capital structure
- Theory of the firm – Theories relating to firms' roles in the economy
- The Theory of Investment Value, book by John Burr Williams – American economist
- Agency theory – Conflict of interest when one person acts on another's behalf
  - Agency costs – Costs arising from conflicts of interest between principals and their agents
  - Contract theory – Economic analysis of contracts
- Managerial finance – Application of financial principles to managerial decision-making
- Capital structure – Mix of funds used to start and sustain a business
  - Corporate finance § Capitalization structure
  - Capital structure substitution theory – Theory proposing that managers adjust capital structure to maximize earnings per share
  - Pecking order theory – Theory that firms prefer internal funds, then debt, and use equity last
  - Market timing hypothesis – Hypothesis that firms adjust financing decisions to exploit favourable market conditions
  - Trade-off theory of capital structure – Financial concept
  - Merton model – Model that values credit risk using option-based default mechanics
  - Tax shield – Reduction in taxable income achieved through allowable deductible expenses
- Dividend policy – Policies in finance
  - Corporate finance § Dividend policy
  - Walter model – Policies in finance
  - Gordon model – Valuation model that prices a stock by discounting expected future dividends
  - Lintner model – American economist (1916–1983)
  - Residuals theory – Policies in finance
  - Signaling hypothesis – Policies in finance
  - Clientele effect – Investor shifts caused by policy changes that attract different investor groups
  - Dividend puzzle – Why firms pay dividends despite theories predicting investor indifference
  - Treasury stock § Buying back shares
  - Dividend tax – Tax levied on stock earnings
- Capital budgeting – How an organization allocates its cash and resources
  - Corporate finance § Investment and project valuation
  - Clean surplus accounting – Valuing firms by changes in book value excluding shareholder transactions
  - Residual income valuation – Equity valuation method based on the present value of future residual income
  - Economic value added – Value of a firm's profit after deduction of capital costs
  - Market value added – Measure comparing a firm's market value with the capital invested in it
  - T-model – Connects fundamentals with investment return
  - Adjusted present value – Valuation separating financing effects
  - Uncertainty
    - Penalized present value – Method of budgeting where an investment's value is penalized according to its risk
    - Expected commercial value – Prospect-weighted valuation method for assessing uncertain project outcomes
    - Risk-adjusted net present value – Valuation in finance
    - Contingent claim valuation – Derivative whose payoff depends on an underlying asset or uncertain future event
    - Real options – Capital budgeting analysis term
    - Monte Carlo methods – Probabilistic measurement methods
- Risk management
  - Corporate finance § Financial risk management
  - Financial risk management § Corporate finance
  - Hedging irrelevance proposition – Protecting economic value by managing risk exposure
  - Risk modeling – Modelling financial risks
  - Risk-adjusted return on capital – Profitability measurement framework

=== Asset pricing theory ===
- Value (economics) – Benefit provided by a good or service in an economy
  - Fair value – Financial estimation of potential market price
  - Intrinsic value – Value calculated on simplified assumptions
  - Market price – Amount of money given in order to purchase a thing or service
  - Expected value – Average value of a random variable
  - Opportunity cost – Benefit lost by a choice between options
  - Risk premium – Measure of excess
  - #Underlying theory below
- Financial markets
  - Stylized fact – Simplified presentation of empirical finding
  - Regulatory economics – Economics of regulation
    - Macroprudential regulation § Theoretical rationale
  - Market microstructure – How trading mechanisms and market design shape prices, liquidity, and transaction costs
    - Walrasian auction – Theoretical auction process where prices adjust until all markets clear
    - Fisher market
    - Arrow-Debreu market – Economic Model
    - Matching market – Field of market economics
  - Market design – Methodology for creation of markets
  - Agent-based model – Type of computational models
    - Representative agent
    - Aggregation problem – Concept in economics
    - Heterogeneity in economics
      - Heterogeneous agent model
      - Agent-based model § In economics and social sciences
      - Artificial financial market – Academic discipline concerned with the exchange of money
- General equilibrium theory – Theory of equilibrium between supply and demand
  - Supply and demand – Economic model of price determination in a market
  - Competitive equilibrium – Economic equilibrium concept
  - Economic equilibrium – Situation where economic forces are balanced
  - Partial equilibrium – Concept in economics
- Equilibrium price – Situation where economic forces are balanced
  - Market efficiency – Economic theory that asset prices fully reflect all available information
  - Economic equilibrium – Situation where economic forces are balanced
  - Rational expectations – Economics concept
  - Risk factor (finance) – Concept in finance
- Arbitrage-free – Capitalisation of risk-free opportunities in financial markets
  - Rational pricing – Assumption in financial economics
    - § Arbitrage free pricing – Assumption in financial economics
    - § Risk neutral valuation – Assumption in financial economics
  - Contingent claim analysis – Derivative whose payoff depends on an underlying asset or uncertain future event
  - Brownian model of financial markets – Financial model
  - Complete market & Incomplete markets
- Utility – Concept in economics and decision theory
  - Risk aversion – Economics theory
  - Expected utility hypothesis – Concept in economics
  - Utility maximization problem – Problem of allocation of money by consumers in order to most benefit themselves
  - Marginal utility – Benefit derived from consuming a product
  - Quasilinear utility – Function linear in one argument, used in economics and consumer theory
  - Generalized expected utility
- Economic efficiency – Situation in which nothing can be improved without something else being hurt
  - Efficient-market hypothesis – Economic theory that asset prices fully reflect all available information
  - efficient frontier – Investment portfolio which occupies the "efficient" parts of the risk-return spectrum
  - Production–possibility frontier – Visualization of all possible options of output for a two-good economy
  - Allocative efficiency – When production relates to consumer preferences in an economy
  - Pareto efficiency – Weakly optimal allocation of resources
  - Productive efficiency – When one must decrease production of one good to increase another in an economy
  - Dumb agent theory – Hypothesis in economics regarding true value of stocks by consensus
- Stochastic discount factor – Concept in financial economics
  - Pricing kernel – Concept in financial economics
  - Marginal rate of substitution – Concept in consumer economics
  - Hansen–Jagannathan bound – Theorem in financial economics
  - Girsanov theorem – Theorem on changes in stochastic processes
  - Radon–Nikodym derivative – Expressing a measure as an integral of another
- State prices – Economic Model
  - Arrow–Debreu model – Economic Model
  - Application:
    - Arrow–Debreu model § Economics of uncertainty: insurance and finance
    - State prices § Application to financial assets
- Fundamental theorem of asset pricing – Necessary and sufficient conditions for a market to be arbitrage free and complete
  - Rational pricing – Assumption in financial economics
  - Arbitrage-free – Capitalisation of risk-free opportunities in financial markets
  - No free lunch with vanishing risk – Concept in mathematical finance
  - Self-financing portfolio
  - Stochastic dominance – Partial order between random variables
    - Marginal conditional stochastic dominance
- Martingale pricing
  - Brownian model of financial markets – Financial model
  - Random walk hypothesis – Financial theory
  - Risk-neutral measure – Probability measure
  - Martingale (probability theory) – Model in probability theory
    - Sigma-martingale
    - Semimartingale – Type of stochastic process
- Quantum finance – Subfield of econophysics which applies quantum theory to finance

==== Asset pricing models ====
- Equilibrium pricing
  - Equities; foreign exchange and commodities
    - Capital asset pricing model – Finance model linking expected return to systematic risk
    - Consumption-based CAPM – Return on investment metrics
    - Intertemporal CAPM
    - Single-index model – Economic model
    - Multiple factor models – Asset pricing models
      - Fama–French three-factor model – Statistical model for asset pricing in finance
      - Carhart four-factor model – Model for stock portfolio management
    - Arbitrage pricing theory – Asset pricing theory
  - Bonds; other interest rate instruments
    - Vasicek – Mathematical model of interest rates
    - Rendleman–Bartter – Short-rate model describing the evolution of interest rates
    - Cox–Ingersoll–Ross – Stochastic model for the evolution of financial interest rates
- Risk neutral pricing
  - Equities; foreign exchange and commodities; interest rates
    - Black–Scholes – Mathematical model of financial markets
    - Black – Financial model
    - Garman–Kohlhagen – Derivative financial instrument
    - Heston – Model in finance
    - CEV – Pricing model
    - SABR – Stochastic volatility model used in derivatives markets
  - Bonds; other interest rate instruments
    - Ho–Lee – Short-rate model in financial mathematics
    - Hull–White – Model of future interest rates
    - Black–Derman–Toy – Short-rate model in mathematical finance
    - Black–Karasinski – Mathematical model of interest rate terms
    - Kalotay–Williams–Fabozzi – Interest-rate model describing the stochastic evolution of the instantaneous short rate
    - Longstaff–Schwartz – Interest-rate model describing the stochastic evolution of the instantaneous short rate
    - Chen – Three-factor short-rate model for interest-rate dynamics
    - Rendleman–Bartter – Short-rate model describing the evolution of interest rates
    - Heath–Jarrow–Morton – Model of interest rate curves
      - Cheyette – Model in mathematical finance
    - Brace–Gatarek–Musiela – Financial model of interest rates
      - LIBOR market model – Financial model of interest rates

== Mathematics and finance ==
=== Time value of money ===
- Present value – Current worth of a future sum discounted to today
- Future value – Value of an asset at a specific date
- Discounting – When a creditor delays payments from a debtor in exchange for a fee
- Net present value – Valuation in finance
- Internal rate of return – Method of calculating an investment's rate of return
- Annuity – Series of payments made at equal intervals
- Perpetuity – Annuity with payments made at equal intervals indefinitely

=== Financial mathematics ===
==== Mathematical tools ====
- Probability – Number measuring the chance an event occurs
  - Probability distribution – Mathematical function for the probability a given outcome occurs in an experiment
    - Binomial distribution – Probability distribution
    - Log-normal distribution – Probability distribution
    - Poisson distribution – Discrete probability distribution
- Stochastic calculus – Calculus on stochastic processes
  - Brownian motion – Random motion of particles suspended in a fluid
    - Geometric Brownian motion – Continuous stochastic process
  - Cameron–Martin theorem – Theorem describing translation of Gaussian measures on Hilbert spaces
  - Feynman–Kac formula – Formula relating stochastic processes to partial differential equations
  - Girsanov's theorem – Theorem on changes in stochastic processes
  - Itô's lemma – Identity in Itô calculus analogous to the chain rule
  - Martingale representation theorem – Theorem in probability theory
  - Radon–Nikodym derivative – Expressing a measure as an integral of another
  - Stochastic differential equations – Differential equations involving stochastic processes
  - Stochastic process – Collection of random variables
    - Jump process – Stochastic process with discrete movements
    - Lévy process – Stochastic process in probability theory
    - Markov process – Random process independent of past history
    - Ornstein–Uhlenbeck process – Stochastic process modeling random walk with friction
    - Wiener process – Stochastic process generalizing Brownian motion
- Monte Carlo methods
  - Low-discrepancy sequence – Type of mathematical sequence
  - Monte Carlo integration – Numerical technique
  - Quasi-Monte Carlo method – Numerical integration process
  - Random number generation – Creating sequence of numbers that cannot be predicted
- Partial differential equations
  - Finite difference method – Class of numerical techniques
  - Heat equation – Partial differential equation describing the evolution of temperature in a region
  - Numerical partial differential equations – Branch of numerical analysis
    - Crank–Nicolson method – Finite difference method for numerically solving parabolic differential equations
- Volatility – Degree of variation of a trading price series over time
  - ARCH model – Time series model
  - GARCH model – Time series model
  - Stochastic volatility – When variance is a random variable
  - Stochastic volatility jump – Class of financial models with stochastic volatility and jumps

==== Derivatives pricing ====
- Underlying logic (see also #Economics and finance above)
  - Rational pricing – Assumption in financial economics
    - Risk-neutral measure – Probability measure
    - Arbitrage-free pricing
  - Brownian model of financial markets – Financial model
  - Martingale pricing
- Forward contract – Financial derivative
  - Forward contract pricing – Financial derivative
- Futures – Standardised contract to buy or sell an asset at a future date
  - Futures contract pricing – Standardised contract to buy or sell an asset at a future date
- Options (incl. Real options and ESOs)
  - Valuation of options – Concept in finance
  - Black–Scholes formula – Mathematical model of financial markets
    - Approximations for American options
      - Barone-Adesi and Whaley – Mathematical model of financial markets
      - Bjerksund and Stensland – Mathematical model of financial markets
      - Black's approximation – Method for estimating a call option value
      - Optimal stopping – Class of mathematical problems
      - Roll–Geske–Whaley – Mathematical model of financial markets
  - Black model – Financial model
  - Binomial options model – Numerical method for the valuation of financial options
  - Finite difference methods for option pricing – Numerical method in mathematical finance
  - Garman–Kohlhagen model
  - The Greeks – Model parameters in mathematical finance
  - Lattice model (finance) – Method for evaluating stock options that divides time into discrete intervals
  - Margrabe's formula – Formula that calculates option prices for dividend-paying stocks
  - Monte Carlo methods for option pricing – Model in mathematical finance
    - Monte Carlo methods in finance – Probabilistic measurement methods
    - Quasi-Monte Carlo methods in finance
    - Least Square Monte Carlo for American options
  - Trinomial tree – Model used in financial mathematics
  - Volatility – Degree of variation of a trading price series over time
    - Implied volatility – Financial mathematical measure
    - Historical volatility – Degree of variation of a trading price series over time
    - Volatility smile (& Volatility surface)
    - Stochastic volatility – When variance is a random variable
      - Constant elasticity of variance model – Pricing model
      - Heston model – Model in finance
      - SABR volatility model – Stochastic volatility model used in derivatives markets
    - Local volatility – Option pricing model
      - Implied binomial tree – Method for evaluating stock options that divides time into discrete intervals
      - Implied trinomial tree – Method for evaluating stock options that divides time into discrete intervals
      - Edgeworth binomial tree – Method for evaluating stock options that divides time into discrete intervals
      - Johnson binomial tree – Method for evaluating stock options that divides time into discrete intervals
- Swaps – Exchange of derivatives or other financial instruments
  - Swap valuation – Exchange of derivatives or other financial instruments
    - Asset swap § Computing the asset swap spread
    - Credit default swap § Pricing and valuation
    - Cross-currency swap § Valuation and pricing
    - Interest rate swap § Valuation and pricing
      - Multi-curve framework – Mathematical finance concept
    - Variance swap § Pricing and valuation
- Interest rate derivatives (bond options, swaptions, caps and floors, and others)
  - Black model – Financial model
    - caps and floors – Type of interest rate derivative
    - swaptions – Option granting the owner the right to a financial swap
    - Bond options – Option to trade bonds at a certain price
  - Short-rate models (generally applied via lattice based- and specialized simulation-models, although "Black like" formulae exist in some cases.)
    - Rendleman–Bartter model – Short-rate model describing the evolution of interest rates
    - Vasicek model – Mathematical model of interest rates
    - Ho–Lee model – Short-rate model in financial mathematics
    - Hull–White model – Model of future interest rates
    - Cox–Ingersoll–Ross model – Stochastic model for the evolution of financial interest rates
    - Black–Karasinski model – Mathematical model of interest rate terms
    - Black–Derman–Toy model – Short-rate model in mathematical finance
    - Kalotay–Williams–Fabozzi model – Interest-rate model describing the stochastic evolution of the instantaneous short rate
    - Longstaff–Schwartz model – Interest-rate model describing the stochastic evolution of the instantaneous short rate
    - Chen model – Three-factor short-rate model for interest-rate dynamics
  - Forward rate / Forward curve -based models (Application as per short-rate models)
    - LIBOR market model (also called: Brace–Gatarek–Musiela Model, BGM)
    - Heath–Jarrow–Morton Model (HJM)
    - Cheyette model – Model in mathematical finance
- Valuation adjustments
  - Credit valuation adjustment – Economics term
  - XVA – Banking valuation adjustments
- Yield curve modelling
  - Multi-curve framework – Mathematical finance concept
  - Bootstrapping (finance) – Method for constructing a fixed-income yield curve
  - Yield curve § Construction of the full yield curve from market data
  - Fixed-income attribution § Modeling the yield curve
  - Nelson-Siegel – Measurement of risk in a portfolio
  - Principal component analysis § Quantitative finance

==== Portfolio mathematics ====
- #Mathematical techniques below
- #Quantitative investing below
- Modern portfolio theory § Mathematical model
- Portfolio optimization – Process of selecting a portfolio
  - § Optimization methods – Process of selecting a portfolio
  - § Mathematical tools – Process of selecting a portfolio
- Merton's portfolio problem – Problem in continuous-time finance
- Kelly criterion – Bet sizing formula for long-term growth
- Roy's safety-first criterion – Risk management technique in investing
- Specific applications:
  - Black–Litterman model – Financial model for portfolio allocation
  - Universal portfolio algorithm – Portfolio selection algorithm
  - Markowitz model – Portfolio optimization model in finance
  - Treynor–Black model

== Financial markets ==
=== Market and instruments ===
- Capital markets
- Securities
- Financial markets
- Primary market
- Initial public offering
- Aftermarket
- Free market
- Bull market
- Bear market
- Bear market rally
- Market maker
- Dow Jones Industrial Average
- Nasdaq
- List of stock exchanges
- List of stock market indices
- List of corporations by market capitalization
- Value Line Composite Index

=== Equity market ===
- Stock market
- Stock
- Common stock
- Preferred stock
- Treasury stock
- Equity investment
- Index investing
- Private Equity
- Financial reports and statements
- Fundamental analysis
- Dividend
- Dividend yield
- Stock split

==== Equity valuation ====
- Dow theory
- Elliott wave principle
- Economic value added
- Fibonacci retracement
- Gordon model
- Growth stock
  - PEG ratio
  - PVGO
- Mergers and acquisitions
- Leveraged buyout
- Takeover
- Corporate raid
- PE ratio
- Market capitalization
- Income per share
- Stock valuation
- Technical analysis
- Chart patterns
- V-trend
- Paper valuation

==== Investment theory ====
- Behavioral finance
- Dead cat bounce
- Efficient market hypothesis
- Market microstructure
- Stock market crash
- Stock market bubble
- January effect
- Mark Twain effect
- Quantitative behavioral finance
- Quantitative analysis (finance)
- Statistical arbitrage

=== Bond market ===
- Bond (finance)
- Zero-coupon bond
- Junk bonds
- Convertible bond
- Accrual bond
- Municipal bond
- Sovereign bond
- Bond valuation
  - Yield to maturity
  - Bond duration
  - Bond convexity
- Fixed income

=== Money market ===
- Repurchase agreement
- International Money Market
- Currency
- Exchange rate
- International currency codes
- Table of historical exchange rates

=== Commodity market ===
- Commodity
  - Asset
  - Commodity Futures Trading Commission
  - Commodity trade
  - Drawdowns
  - Forfaiting
  - Fundamental analysis
  - Futures contract
  - Fungibility
  - Gold as an investment
  - Hedging
  - Jesse Lauriston Livermore
  - List of traded commodities
  - Ownership equity
  - Position trader
  - Risk (Futures)
  - Seasonal traders
  - Seasonal spread trading
  - Slippage
  - Speculation
  - Spread trade
  - Technical analysis
    - Breakout
    - Bear market
    - Bottom (technical analysis)
    - Bull market
    - MACD
    - Moving average
    - Open Interest
    - Parabolic SAR
    - Point and figure charts
    - Resistance
    - RSI
    - Stochastic oscillator
    - Stop loss
    - Support
    - Top (technical analysis)
  - Trade
  - Trend

=== Derivatives market ===
- Derivative (finance)
- (see also Financial mathematics topics; Derivatives pricing)
- Underlying instrument

==== Forward markets and contracts ====
- Forward contract

==== Futures markets and contracts ====
- Backwardation
- Contango
- Futures contract
  - Financial future
    - Currency future
    - Interest rate future
    - Single-stock futures
    - Stock market index future
- Futures exchange

==== Option markets and contracts ====
- Options
  - Stock option
    - Box spread
    - Call option
    - Put option
    - Strike price
    - Put–call parity
    - The Greeks
    - Black–Scholes formula
    - Black model
    - Binomial options model
    - Implied volatility
    - Option time value
    - Moneyness
      - At-the-money
      - In-the-money
      - Out-of-the-money
    - Straddle
    - Option style
      - Vanilla option
      - Exotic option
      - Binary option
      - European option
        - Interest rate floor
        - Interest rate cap
      - Bermudan option
      - American option
      - Quanto option
      - Asian option
    - Employee stock option
  - Warrants
  - Foreign exchange option
  - Interest rate options
  - Bond options
  - Real options
  - Options on futures

==== Swap markets and contracts ====
- Swap (finance)
  - Interest rate swap
  - Basis swap
  - Asset swap
  - Forex swap
  - Stock swap
  - Equity swap
  - Currency swap
  - Variance swap

==== Derivative markets by underlyings ====
===== Equity derivatives =====
- Contract for difference (CFD)
- Exchange-traded fund (ETF)
  - Closed-end fund
  - Inverse exchange-traded fund
- Equity options
- Equity swap
- Real estate investment trust (REIT)
- Warrants
  - Covered warrant

===== Interest rate derivatives =====
- LIBOR
- Forward rate agreement
- Interest rate swap
- Interest rate cap
- Exotic interest rate option
- Bond option
- Interest rate future
- Money market instruments
- Range accrual Swaps/Notes/Bonds
- In-arrears Swap
- Constant maturity swap (CMS) or Constant Treasury Swap (CTS) derivatives (swaps, caps, floors)
- Interest rate Swaption
- Bermudan swaptions
- Cross currency swaptions
- Power Reverse Dual Currency note (PRDC or Turbo)
- Target redemption note (TARN)
- CMS steepener
- Snowball
- Inverse floater
- Strips of Collateralized mortgage obligation
  - Interest only (IO)
  - Principal only (PO)
- Ratchet caps and floors

===== Credit derivatives =====
- Credit default swap
- Collateralized debt obligation
- Credit default option
- Total return swap
- Securitization
  - Strip financing

===== Foreign exchange derivative =====
- Basis swap
- Currency future
- Currency swap
- Foreign exchange binary option
- Foreign exchange forward
- Foreign exchange option
- Forward exchange rate
- Foreign exchange swap
- Foreign exchange hedge
- Non-deliverable forward
- Power reverse dual-currency note

== Financial regulation ==
- Corporate governance
- Financial regulation
  - Bank regulation
    - Banking license
- License

=== Designations and accreditation ===
- Certified Financial Planner
- Chartered Financial Analyst
  - CFA Institute
- Chartered Alternative Investment Analyst
- Professional risk manager
- Chartered Financial Consultant
- Canadian Securities Institute
- Independent financial adviser
  - Chartered Insurance Institute
- Financial Risk Manager
- Chartered Market Technician
- Certified Financial Technician

=== Litigation ===
- Liabilities Subject to Compromise

=== Fraud ===
- Forex scam
- Insider trading
- Legal origins theory
- Petition mill
- Ponzi scheme

=== Industry bodies ===
- International Swaps and Derivatives Association
- National Association of Securities Dealers

=== Regulatory and supervisory bodies ===
==== International ====
- Bank for International Settlements
- International Organization of Securities Commissions
- Security Commission
- Basel Committee on Banking Supervision
- Basel Accords – Basel I, Basel II, Basel III
- International Association of Insurance Supervisors
- International Accounting Standards Board

==== European Union ====
- European Securities Committee (EU)
- Committee of European Securities Regulators (EU)

==== Regulatory bodies by country ====
===== United Kingdom =====
- Financial Conduct Authority
- Prudential Regulation Authority

===== United States =====
- Commodity Futures Trading Commission
- Federal Reserve
- Federal Trade Commission
- Municipal Securities Rulemaking Board
- Office of the Comptroller of the Currency
- Securities and Exchange Commission

=== United States legislation ===
- Glass–Steagall Act (US)
- Gramm–Leach–Bliley Act (US)
- Sarbanes–Oxley Act (US)
- Securities Act of 1933 (US)
- Securities Exchange Act of 1934 (US)
- Investment Advisers Act of 1940 (US)
- USA PATRIOT Act

== Actuarial topics ==
- Actuarial topics

== Valuation ==
=== Underlying theory ===
- Value (economics)
- Valuation (finance) and specifically § Valuation overview
- "The Theory of Investment Value"
- Financial economics § Corporate finance theory
- Valuation risk
- Real versus nominal value (economics)
- Real prices and ideal prices
- Fair value
  - Fair value accounting
- Intrinsic value
- Market price
- Value in use
- Fairness opinion
- Asset pricing (see also #Asset pricing theory above)
  - Arbitrage-free price
    - Rational pricing § Shares
  - Equilibrium price
    - market efficiency
    - economic equilibrium
    - rational expectations

=== Context ===
- (Corporate) Bonds
  - Bond valuation
  - Bond (finance) § Bond valuation
  - Corporate bond § Valuation
- Equity valuation
  - #Equity valuation above
  - Fundamental analysis
  - Stock valuation
  - Capital Markets
  - Business valuation
  - Equity (finance) § Valuation
  - Intrinsic value (finance) § Equity
  - Capital budgeting and Corporate finance § Investment and project valuation
  - The Theory of Investment Value
- Real estate valuation
  - Real estate appraisal
  - Real estate economics

=== Considerations ===
- Bonds
  - covenants and indentures
  - secured / unsecured debt
  - senior / subordinated debt
  - embedded options
- Equity
  - Minimum acceptable rate of return
  - Margin of safety (financial)
  - Enterprise value
  - Sum-of-the-parts analysis
    - Conglomerate discount
  - Minority discount
  - Control premium
  - Accretion/dilution analysis
  - Certainty equivalent
  - Haircut (finance)
  - Paper valuation

=== Discounted cash flow valuation ===
- Bond valuation
  - Modeling
    - Present value § PV of a bond
    - Bond valuation § Present value approach
    - Bond valuation § Arbitrage-free pricing approach
    - embedded options:
      - Pull to par
      - Lattice model (finance) § Hybrid securities
  - Results
    - Clean price
    - Dirty price
    - Yield to maturity
    - Coupon yield
    - Current yield
    - Duration
    - Convexity
    - embedded options:
      - Option-adjusted spread
      - effective duration
      - effective convexity
  - Cash flows
    - Principal (finance)
    - Coupon (bond)
    - Fixed rate bond
    - Floating rate note
    - Zero-coupon bond
    - Accrual bond
    - sinking fund provisions
- Real estate valuation
  - Intrinsic value (finance) § Real estate
  - Income approach
    - Net Operating Income
    - Real estate appraisal § The income approach
    - German income approach
- Equity valuation
  - Results
    - Net present value
    - Adjusted present value
    - Equivalent Annual Cost
    - Payback period
    - Discounted payback period
    - Internal rate of return
    - Modified Internal Rate of Return
    - Return on investment
    - Profitability index
  - Specific models and approaches
    - Dividend discount model
    - Gordon growth model
    - Market value added / Economic value added
    - Residual income valuation
    - First Chicago Method
    - rNPV
    - Fed model
    - Sum of perpetuities method
    - Benjamin Graham formula
    - LBO valuation model
    - Goldman Sachs asset management factor model
  - Cash flows
    - Cash flow forecasting
    - EBIDTA
    - NOPAT
    - Free cash flow
      - Free cash flow to firm
      - Free cash flow to equity
    - Dividends
    - Valuation using discounted cash flows § Determine cash flow for each forecast period

=== Relative valuation ===
- Bonds
  - Bond valuation § Relative price approach
  - Yield spread
    - I-spread
    - Option-adjusted spread
    - Z-spread
    - Asset swap spread
  - Credit spread (bond)
    - Bond credit rating
    - Altman Z-score
    - Ohlson O-score
    - Book value
    - Debt-to-equity ratio
    - Debt-to-capital ratio
    - Current ratio
    - Quick ratio
    - Debt ratio
- Real estate
  - Capitalization rate
  - Gross rent multiplier
  - Sales comparison approach
    - Real estate appraisal § The sales comparison approach
  - Cash on cash return
- Equity
  - Financial ratio
  - Market-based valuation
  - Valuation using multiples
  - Comparable company analysis
  - Dividend yield
    - Yield gap
  - Return on equity
    - DuPont analysis
  - PE ratio
    - PEG ratio
    - Cyclically adjusted price-to-earnings ratio
    - PVGO
  - P/B ratio
  - Price to cash based earnings
  - Price to Sales
  - EV/EBITDA
  - EV/Sales
  - Stock image
  - Valuation using the Market Penetration Model
  - Graham number
  - Tobin's q

=== Contingent claim valuation ===
- Valuation techniques
  - general
    - Valuation of options
    - Option (finance) § Valuation
    - #Derivatives pricing above
  - as typically employed
    - Real options valuation
    - Rational pricing § The replicating portfolio
    - Financial economics § Corporate finance theory
    - Lattice model (finance) § Hybrid securities
    - Monte Carlo methods in finance
- Applications
  - Corporate investments and projects
    - Real options
    - Corporate finance § Valuing flexibility
    - Contingent value rights
    - Business valuation § Option pricing approaches
    - structured finance investments (funding dependent)
    - special purpose entities (funding dependent)
  - Balance sheet assets and liabilities
    - warrants and other convertible securities
    - securities with embedded options such as callable bonds
    - employee stock options

=== Other approaches ===
- "Fundamentals"-based (relying on accounting information)
  - T-model
  - Residual income valuation
  - Clean surplus accounting
  - Net asset value method
  - Excess earnings method
  - Historical earnings valuation
  - Future maintainable earnings valuation
  - Graham number

=== Financial modeling ===
- Cash flow
  - Cash flow forecasting
  - Cash flow statement
  - Operating cash flow
  - EBIDTA
    - Depreciation § Effect on cash
  - NOPAT
  - Free cash flow
    - Free cash flow to firm
    - Free cash flow to equity
  - Dividends
  - Cash is king
  - Mid-year adjustment
  - Owner earnings
- Required return (i.e. discount rate)
  - Valuation using discounted cash flows § Determine discount factor / rate
  - Cost of capital
  - Weighted average cost of capital
  - Cost of equity
  - Cost of debt
  - Capital asset pricing model
    - Beta (finance) § Empirical estimation
    - Hamada's equation
    - Pure play method
  - Arbitrage pricing theory
  - Business valuation § Build-up method
    - Total Beta
  - T-model
    - cash-flow T-model
- Terminal value
  - Valuation using discounted cash flows § Determine the continuing value
  - Forecast period (finance)
  - long term growth rate
    - Sustainable growth rate § From a financial perspective
    - Stock valuation § Growth rate
- Forecasted financial statements
  - Financial forecast
  - Financial modeling § Accounting
  - Pro forma § Financial statements
  - Revenue
    - Revenue model
    - Revenue § Financial statement analysis
    - Revenue management § Forecasting
    - Net sales
  - Costs
    - Profit margin
      - Gross margin
      - Net margin
      - Cost of goods sold
    - Operating expenses
      - Operating ratio
    - Cost driver
    - Fixed cost
    - Variable cost
    - Overhead cost
    - Value chain
    - activity based costing
    - common-size analysis
    - Profit model
  - Capital
    - Capital structure
    - common-size analysis
    - Equity (finance)
      - Shareholders' equity
      - Book value
      - Retained earnings
    - Financial capital
      - Long term asset / Fixed asset
        - Fixed-asset turnover
      - Long-term liabilities
        - Debt-to-equity ratio
        - Debt-to-capital ratio
    - Working capital
      - Current asset
      - Current liability
      - Inventory turnover / Days in inventory
      - Cost of goods sold
      - Debtor & Creditor days
      - Days sales outstanding
      - Days payable outstanding

== Portfolio theory ==
=== General concepts ===
- Portfolio (finance)
- Portfolio manager
- Investment management
  - Active management
  - Passive management (Buy and hold)
    - Index fund
  - Core & Satellite
  - Smart beta
  - Expense ratio
  - Investment style
    - Value investing
    - Contrarian investing
    - Growth investing
      - CAN SLIM
    - Index investing
    - Magic formula investing
    - Momentum investing
    - Quality investing
    - Style investing
    - Factor investing
    - Thematic investing
  - Investment strategy
    - Benchmark-driven investment strategy
    - Liability-driven investment strategy
  - Financial risk management § Investment management
- Investor profile
- Rate of return on a portfolio / Investment performance
- Risk return ratio
  - Risk–return spectrum
- Risk factor (finance)
- Portfolio optimization
- Diversification (finance)
- Asset classes
  - Exter's Pyramid
- Asset allocation
  - Tactical asset allocation
    - Global tactical asset allocation
    - Cyclical tactical asset allocation
  - Strategic asset allocation
  - Dynamic asset allocation
- Sector rotation
- Correlation & covariance
  - Covariance matrix
  - Correlation matrix
- Risk-free interest rate
- Leverage (finance)
- Utility function
- Intertemporal portfolio choice
- Portfolio insurance
  - Constant proportion portfolio insurance
- Mathematical finance § Risk and portfolio management: the P world
- Quantitative investment / Quantitative fund (see below)
- Uncompensated risk

=== Modern portfolio theory ===
- Portfolio optimization
  - Risk return ratio
  - Risk–return spectrum
  - Economic efficiency
    - Efficient-market hypothesis
    - Random walk hypothesis
  - Utility maximization problem
  - Markowitz model
  - Merton's portfolio problem
  - Kelly criterion
  - Roy's safety-first criterion
- Theory and results (derivation of the CAPM)
  - Equilibrium price
  - Market price
  - Systematic risk
    - Risk factor (finance)
  - Idiosyncratic risk / Specific risk
  - Mean-variance analysis (Two-moment decision model)
  - Efficient frontier (Mean variance efficiency)
  - Feasible set
  - Mutual fund separation theorem
    - Separation property (finance)
  - Tangent portfolio
  - Market portfolio
  - Beta (finance)
    - Fama–MacBeth regression
    - Hamada's equation
    - Capital structure substitution theory § Beta
  - Capital allocation line
  - Capital market line
  - Security characteristic line
  - Capital asset pricing model
    - Single-index model
  - Security market line
  - Roll's critique
- Related measures
  - Alpha (finance)
  - Sharpe ratio
  - Treynor ratio
  - Jensen's alpha
- Optimization models
  - Markowitz model
  - Treynor–Black model
- Equilibrium pricing models (CAPM and extensions)
  - Capital asset pricing model (CAPM)
  - Consumption-based capital asset pricing model (CCAPM)
  - Intertemporal CAPM (ICAPM)
  - Single-index model
  - Multiple factor models (see Risk factor (finance))
    - Fama–French three-factor model
    - Carhart four-factor model
    - Arbitrage pricing theory (APT)

=== Post-modern portfolio theory ===
- Approaches
  - Behavioral portfolio theory
  - Stochastic portfolio theory – Mathematical theory for analyzing stock market structure and portfolio behavior
    - Chance-constrained portfolio selection – Approach to portfolio selection under loss aversion
  - Maslowian portfolio theory
  - Dedicated portfolio theory (fixed income specific)
  - Risk parity – Approach to investment management focusing on allocation of risk
  - Tail risk parity
- Optimization considerations
  - Pareto efficiency – Weakly optimal allocation of resources
  - Bayesian efficiency – Analog of Pareto efficiency for situations with incomplete information
  - Multiple-criteria decision analysis – Operations research that evaluates multiple conflicting criteria in decision making
  - Multi-objective optimization – Mathematical concept
  - Stochastic dominance – Partial order between random variables
    - Second-order Stochastic dominance – Partial order between random variables
    - Marginal conditional stochastic dominance
  - Downside risk – Risk of the actual return being below the expected return
  - Volatility skewness – Portfolio theory
  - Semivariance – Statistical measure of how far values spread from their average
  - Expected shortfall (ES; also called conditional value at risk (CVaR), average value at risk (AVaR), expected tail loss (ETL))
  - Tail value at risk – Risk measure estimating the average loss in the worst tail of the distribution
  - Statistical dispersion – Statistical property quantifying how much a collection of data is spread out
  - Discounted maximum loss – Measure of worst-case loss discounted to present value
  - Indifference price
- Measures
  - Dual-beta
    - Downside beta
    - Upside beta
  - Upside potential ratio
  - Upside risk
  - Downside risk – Risk of the actual return being below the expected return
  - Sortino ratio – Measurement in finance
  - Omega ratio – Concept in financial risk modeling
  - Bias ratio – Indicator in finance
  - Information ratio – Measure of an investment's return vs risk
    - Active return – Measure of profitability relative to an investment benchmark
    - Active risk – Measure of investment risk
  - Deviation risk measure – Risk metric quantifying variability of returns around their expected value
  - Distortion risk measure – Risk measure derived by applying a distortion function to a loss distribution
  - Spectral risk measure – Coherent risk measure using weighted outcomes based on risk aversion
- Optimization models
  - Black–Litterman model – Financial model for portfolio allocation
  - Universal portfolio algorithm – Portfolio selection algorithm
  - Resampled efficient frontier – Technique for constructing investment portfolios

=== Performance measurement ===
- Alpha (finance) – Risk-adjusted measure of the so-called active return on an investment
- Beta (finance) – Expected change in price of a stock relative to the whole market
- Performance attribution – Investment portfolio analysis technique
  - Market timing – Buying or selling per prediction of market price trends
  - Stock selection – Method of calculating theoretical values of companies and their stocks
- Fixed-income attribution – Measurement of risk in a portfolio
- Benchmark (finance) – Investment portfolio analysis technique
- Lipper average
- Returns-based style analysis – Statistical technique used to deconstruct the returns of investment strategies
- Rate of return on a portfolio – Ratio of net portfolio earnings
- Holding period return
- Tracking error – Measure of investment risk
  - Attribution analysis – Investment portfolio analysis technique
- Style drift
  - Returns-based style analysis – Statistical technique used to deconstruct the returns of investment strategies
- Simple Dietz method – Means of measuring historical investment portfolio performance
- Modified Dietz method – Historical performance of an investment portfolio
- Modigliani risk-adjusted performance – Measure of the risk-adjusted returns of some investment portfolio
- Upside potential ratio
- Maximum Downside Exposure
- Maximum drawdown – Measure of the decline from a historical peak
  - Sterling ratio
- Sharpe ratio – Formula for measuring financial risk
- Treynor ratio – Measure of financial risk
- Jensen's alpha – Financial calculation
- Bias ratio – Indicator in finance
- V2 ratio
- Calmar ratio

(hedge fund specific)

=== Mathematical techniques ===
- Modern portfolio theory § Mathematical model
- Quadratic programming – Solving an optimization problem with a quadratic objective function
  - Critical line method – Process of selecting a portfolio
- Nonlinear programming – Solution process for some optimization problems
- Mixed integer programming – Method to solve optimization problems
- Stochastic programming (§ Multistage portfolio optimization)
- Copula (probability theory) (§ Quantitative finance)
- Principal component analysis (§ Quantitative finance)
- Deterministic global optimization – Branch of numerical optimization
- Extended Mathematical Programming (§ EMP for stochastic programming)
- Genetic algorithm (List of genetic algorithm applications § Finance and Economics)
- Artificial intelligence:
  - Applications of artificial intelligence § Trading and investment
  - Machine learning (§ Applications)
  - Artificial neural network (§ Finance)

== Quantitative investing ==
- Quantitative investing – Use of mathematical and statistical methods in finance
- Quantitative fund – Investment fund using mathematical methods
- Quantitative analysis (finance) § Quantitative investment management
- Quantitative analysis (finance) § Algorithmic trading quantitative analyst
- Applications of artificial intelligence § Trading and investment
- Trading:
  - Automated trading – System for ordering algorithmic trades
  - High-frequency trading – Type of algorithmic trading
  - Algorithmic trading – Method of executing orders
  - Program trading – Type of trading in securities
  - Systematic trading – Trading modality
    - Technical analysis § Systematic trading
  - Trading strategy – Plan for achieving returns from a financial marketplace
  - Mirror trading – Form of investing
  - Copy trading – Forex trading
  - Social trading – Form of investing
  - VWAP – Financial quantity
  - TWAP – Average price of a security over a specified time
  - Electronic trading platform – Software for trading financial products
  - Statistical arbitrage – Short-term financial trading strategy
- Portfolio optimization:
  - Portfolio optimization § Optimization methods
  - Portfolio optimization § Mathematical tools
  - Black–Litterman model – Financial model for portfolio allocation
  - Universal portfolio algorithm – Portfolio selection algorithm
  - Markowitz model – Portfolio optimization model in finance
  - Treynor–Black model
  - other models – Process of selecting a portfolio
  - Factor investing – Investment approach in stock returns
    - low-volatility investing
    - value investing – Investment paradigm
    - momentum investing – System of trading stocks based on recent performance
  - Alpha generation platform – Technology used in algorithmic trading
  - Kelly criterion – Bet sizing formula for long-term growth
  - Roy's safety-first criterion – Risk management technique in investing
  - Online portfolio selection – Financial stock selection strategy
- Risks:
  - Best execution – Financial regulation
  - Implementation shortfall – Financial concept
  - Trading curb – Regulatory instrument to prevent stock market crashes
  - Market impact – Concept in economics
  - Market depth – Financial term
  - Slippage (finance) – Difference between estimated transaction costs and the amount actually paid
  - Transaction costs – Cost of making any trade
- Discussion:
  - Automated trading system § Market disruption and manipulation
  - High-frequency trading § Risks and controversy
  - Algorithmic trading § Issues and developments
  - Positive feedback § Systemic risk
  - 2010 flash crash – U.S. stock market crash lasting 36 minutes in May 6, 2010
  - Black Monday (1987) § Causes
  - Statistical arbitrage § StatArb and systemic risk: events of summer 2007
- Leading companies (see Quantitative fund § List of notable quantitative funds):
  - Prediction Company – American financial forecasting company
  - Renaissance Technologies – American quantitative hedge fund
  - D. E. Shaw & Co – U.S.-based investment management firm
  - AQR Capital – Global investment management firm
  - Barclays Investment Bank – British banking and financial services company
  - Cantab Capital Partners – Hedge fund based in Cambridge, England
  - Robeco – Dutch asset management firm
  - Jane Street Capital – American market making firm

== Financial software tools ==
- Financial software
- Financial management systems
- Financial data vendor
- Accounting software
  - Straight-through processing
- Banking software
- Treasury management system
- Strategic planning software
- Technical Analysis Software
- Algorithmic trading
- Electronic trading platform

== Financial modeling applications ==
=== Corporate Finance ===
- Business valuation / stock valuation – especially via discounted cash flow, but including other valuation approaches
- Scenario planning and management decision making ("what is"; "what if"; "what has to be done")
- Capital budgeting, including cost of capital (i.e. WACC) calculations
- Financial statement analysis / ratio analysis (including of operating- and finance leases, and R&D)
- Revenue related: forecasting, analysis
- Project finance modeling
- Cash flow forecasting
- Credit decisioning: Credit analysis, Consumer credit risk; impairment- and provision-modeling
- Working capital- and treasury management; asset and liability management
- Management accounting: Activity-based costing, Profitability analysis, Cost analysis, Whole-life cost

=== Quantitative finance ===
- Option pricing and calculation of their "Greeks"
- Other derivatives, especially interest rate derivatives, credit derivatives and exotic derivatives
- Modeling the term structure of interest rates (bootstrapping / multi-curves, short-rate models, HJM framework) and credit spreads
- Credit valuation adjustment, CVA, as well as the various XVA
- Credit risk, counterparty credit risk, and regulatory capital: EAD, PD, LGD, PFE
- Structured product design and manufacture
- Portfolio optimization and Quantitative investing more generally; see further re optimization methods employed.
- Financial risk modeling: value at risk (parametric- and / or historical, CVaR, EVT), stress testing, "sensitivities" analysis

== Financial institutions ==
Financial institutions

- Bank – Financial institution that accepts deposits
  - List of banks
    - List of banks in the Arab World
    - List of banks in Africa
    - List of banks in the Americas
    - List of banks in Asia
    - List of banks in Europe
    - List of banks in Oceania
    - List of international banking institutions
  - Advising bank
  - Central bank – Government body that manages currency and monetary policy
    - List of central banks
  - Commercial bank – Financial institution that accepts deposits and provides loans
  - Community development bank – Bank serving underserved or excluded communities
  - Cooperative bank – Type of retail or commercial bank organized cooperatively
  - Custodian bank – Financial institution providing safekeeping and securities services
  - Depository bank – Specialist bank facilitating investment via depositary receipt services
  - Ethical bank – Bank concerned with the social and environmental impacts of its investments and loans
  - Investment bank – Financial service providing capital-raising and advisory functions
  - Islamic banking – Financial activities compliant with Islamic law
  - Merchant bank – Deals in commercial loans and investment
  - Microcredit – Small loans to impoverished borrowers
  - Mutual savings bank – Depositor-owned savings institution without capital stock
  - Offshore bank – Bank located outside the country of residence of the depositor
  - Private bank – Bank owned by individuals or partners with unlimited liability
  - Savings bank – Financial institution focused on savings deposits
  - Swiss bank
  - Bank holding company – Company with significant ownership of one or more banks
- Building society – Member-owned financial institution focused on savings and mortgages
- Broker – Person who arranges transactions between a buyer and a seller for a commission
  - Broker-dealer – One who engages in the business of trading securities on behalf of their customers
  - Brokerage firm – Person who arranges transactions between a buyer and a seller for a commission
  - Commodity broker – Agent facilitating trades in commodity markets
  - Insurance broker – Intermediary between buyers and sellers of insurance
  - Prime brokerage – Package of services offered by investment banks
  - Retail brokerage – Person who arranges transactions between a buyer and a seller for a commission
  - Stockbroker – Professional who buys and sells shares for others
- Clearing house – Financial institution that provides clearing and settlement services
- Commercial lender – Lending of money
- Community development financial institution – Financial institution in the US and UK
- Credit rating agency – Company that assigns credit ratings
- Credit union – Member-owned financial cooperative
- Diversified financial
- Export Credit Agencies – Intermediary between governments and exporters
- Financial adviser – Professional who renders financial services to clients
- Financial intermediary – Financial institution that connects surplus and deficit agents
- Financial planner – Professional who prepares financial plans for people
- Futures exchange – Financial exchange for futures contracts
  - List of futures exchanges
- Government sponsored enterprise – Type of financial services corporation created by the United States Congress
- Hard money lender – Short-term capital loans funded by private parties and secured by real estate
- Independent financial adviser – Professional who offers financial advice under specific regulatory laws
- Industrial loan company – FDIC-insured financial institutions with unique regulatory status
- Insurance company – Protection from financial loss
- Investment adviser – Professional who renders financial services to clients
- Investment company – Financial institution
- Investment trust – Collective investment fund
- Large and Complex Financial Institutions
- Mutual fund – Professionally managed investment fund
- Non-banking financial company – Institution without a full banking license
- Savings and loan association – Type of financial institution
- Stock exchange – Organization that provides services for stock brokers and traders to trade securities
  - List of stock exchanges
- Trust company – Financial institution offering certain services

== Education ==
- For the typical finance career path and corresponding education requirements see:
  - Financial analyst generally, and esp. § Qualification, discussing various investment, banking, and corporate roles (i.e. financial management, corporate finance, investment banking, securities analysis & valuation, portfolio & investment management, credit analysis, working capital & treasury management; see Financial modeling § Accounting)
  - Quantitative analyst, Quantitative analysis (finance) § Education and Financial engineering § Education, specifically re roles in quantitative finance (i.e. derivative pricing & hedging, interest rate modeling, financial risk management, financial engineering, computational finance; also, the mathematically intensive variant on the banking roles; see Financial modeling § Quantitative finance)
- Business education lists undergraduate degrees in business, commerce, accounting and economics; "finance" may be taken as a major in most of these, whereas "quantitative finance" is almost invariably postgraduate, following a math-focused Bachelors; the most common degrees for (entry level) investment, banking, and corporate roles are:
  - Bachelor of Business Administration (BBA) – Academic degree
  - Bachelor of Commerce (BCom)
  - Bachelor of Accountancy (B.Acc)
  - Bachelor of Economics (B.Econ)
  - Bachelor of Finance – the undergraduate version of the MSF below
  - The tagged BS / BA "in Finance", or less common, "in Investment Management" or "in Personal Finance"
- At the postgraduate level, the MBA, MCom and MSM (and recently the Master of Applied Economics) similarly offer training in finance generally; at this level there are also the following specifically focused master's degrees, with MSF the broadest – see Master of Finance § Comparison with other qualifications for their focus and inter-relation:
  - Master of Applied Finance (M.App.Fin)
  - Master of Commerce in Finance (MCom)
  - Master of Computational Finance
  - Master's in Corporate Finance
  - Master of Finance (M.Fin, MIF)
  - Master's in Financial Analysis
  - Master of Financial Economics
  - Master of Financial Engineering (MFE)
  - Master of Financial Planning
  - Master's in Financial Management
  - Master of Financial Mathematics
  - Master's in Financial Risk Management
  - Master's in Investment Management
  - Master of Mathematical Finance
  - Master of Quantitative Finance (MQF)
  - Master of Science in Finance (MSF, MSc Finance)
  - MS in Fintech
- Doctoral-training in finance is usually a requirement for academia, but not relevant to industry
  - quants often enter the profession with PhDs in disciplines such as physics, mathematics, engineering, and computer science, and learn finance "on the job”
  - as an academic field, finance theory is studied and developed within the disciplines of management, (financial) economics, accountancy, and applied / financial mathematics.
- For specialized roles, there are various Professional Certifications in financial services (see #Designations and accreditation above); the best recognized are arguably:
  - Association of Corporate Treasurers (MCT / FCT)
  - Certificate in Quantitative Finance (CQF)
  - Certified Financial Planner (CFP)
  - Certified International Investment Analyst (CIIA)
  - Certified Treasury Professional (CTP)
  - Chartered Alternative Investment Analyst (CAIA)
  - Chartered Financial Analyst (CFA)
  - Chartered Wealth Manager (CWM)
  - CISI Diploma in Capital Markets (MCSI)
  - Financial Risk Manager (FRM)
  - Professional Risk Manager (PRM)
  - Chartered Accountant related Professional Degree (eg. ACCA)
- Various organizations offer executive education, CPD, or other focused training programs, including:
  - Amsterdam Institute of Finance
  - Canadian Securities Institute
  - Chartered Institute for Securities & Investment
  - GARP
  - Global Risk Institute
  - ICMA Centre
  - The London Institute of Banking & Finance
  - New York Institute of Finance
  - PRMIA
  - South African Institute of Financial Markets
  - Swiss Finance Institute
- See also qualifications in related fields:
  - Accounting § Education, training and qualifications
  - Actuarial credentialing and exams
  - Business education
  - Chief financial officer § Qualifications
  - Chief investment officer § Profile
  - Chief risk officer § Characteristics and qualifications
  - Credit analyst § Education
  - Economics education
  - Management § Training and education

== See also ==
- Capitalism
- Financial law

== Related lists ==
- Index of accounting articles
- Outline of business management
- Outline of marketing
- Outline of economics
- Outline of production
- Index of international trade articles
- Outline of commercial law
- List of business theorists
- Outline of actuarial science
