= Present value of growth opportunities =

In corporate finance, the present value of growth opportunities (PVGO) is a valuation measure applied to growth stocks. It represents the component of the company's stock value that corresponds to (expected) growth in earnings. It thus allows an analyst to assess the extent to which the share price represents the current business, and to what extent it reflects assumptions about the future. PVGO can then also be used in relative valuation, i.e. when comparing between two investments (see similar re PEG ratio).

PVGO is calculated as follows:

PVGO = share price − earnings per share ÷ cost of capital.

This formula arises by thinking of the value of a company as inhering two components: (i) the present value of existing earnings, i.e. the company continuing as if under a "no-growth policy"; and (ii) the present value of the company's growth opportunities. PVGO can then simply be calculated as the difference between the stock price and the present value of its zero-growth-earnings; the latter, the second term in the formula above, uses the calculation for a perpetuity (see Dividend discount model § Some properties of the model).

== Interpretation ==
PVGO separates a company's share value into the value of assets already in place and the value attributed to future profitable growth opportunities. In this framework, the no-growth value is estimated by capitalising expected earnings at the required return, while PVGO represents the difference between the market price and that no-growth value.

A high PVGO indicates that a large portion of the share price depends on expected future growth rather than current earnings alone. Conversely, a low or negative PVGO may indicate that the market price is largely explained by existing earnings, or that expected growth is not viewed as value-creating.
