= Graham number =

Calculated number representing the hypothetical value of a stock

The Graham number or Benjamin Graham number is a figure used in securities investing that measures a stock's so-called fair value. Named after Benjamin Graham, the founder of value investing, the Graham number can be calculated as follows:

$\sqrt{22.5\times(\text{earnings per share})\times(\text{book value per share})}$

The final number is, theoretically, the maximum price that a defensive investor should pay for the given stock. Put another way, a stock priced below the Graham number would be considered a good value, if it also meets a number of other criteria.

The number represents the geometric mean of the maximum that one would pay based on earnings and based on book value. Graham writes:

Current price should not be more than 1 1/2 times the book value last reported. However a multiplier of earnings below 15 could justify a correspondingly higher multiplier of assets. As a rule of thumb we suggest that the product of the multiplier times the ratio of price to book value should not exceed 22.5. (This figure corresponds to 15 times earnings and 1 1/2 times book value. It would admit an issue selling at only 9 times earnings and 2.5 times asset value, etc.)

— Benjamin Graham, The Intelligent Investor, chapter 14

== Derivation ==
The constant 22.5 in the formula is derived from Graham's two criteria for defensive stock selection:

1. The price-to-earnings ratio (P/E) should not exceed 15
2. The price-to-book ratio (P/B) should not exceed 1.5

The product of these two maximum multiples is 15 x 1.5 = 22.5. Since:

$$\text{P/E} \times \text{P/B} = \frac{\text{Price}}{\text{EPS}} \times \frac{\text{Price}}{\text{BVPS}} = \frac{\text{Price}^2}{\text{EPS} \times \text{BVPS}}$$

Setting this product equal to 22.5 and solving for Price yields the Graham number formula:

$$\text{Price} \leq \sqrt{22.5 \times \text{EPS} \times \text{BVPS}}$$

This derivation shows that the Graham number simultaneously enforces both the P/E and P/B constraints in a single metric.

== Alternative calculation ==
Earnings per share is calculated by dividing net income by shares outstanding. Book value is another way of saying shareholders' equity. Therefore, book value per share is calculated by dividing equity by shares outstanding. Consequently, the formula for the Graham number can also be written as follows:

$\sqrt{15 \times 1.5 \times \left(\frac{\text{net income}}{\text{shares outstanding}}\right) \times \left(\frac{\mathrm{shareholders'\ equity}}{\text{shares outstanding}}\right)}$

== Practical example ==
Consider a company with trailing twelve-month earnings per share of $5.00 and a book value per share of $30.00. The Graham number would be:

$$\sqrt{22.5 \times 5.00 \times 30.00} = \sqrt{3375} \approx 58.09$$

Under Graham's framework, a defensive investor should consider paying no more than approximately $58.09 per share for this stock. If the stock is trading at $45, the stock would be trading below its Graham number, suggesting it may be undervalued by this metric. If it is trading at $75, it would exceed the Graham number, indicating the stock may be overvalued relative to its earnings and book value.

== History ==
The Graham number was first mentioned in Benjamin Graham's famous 1949 book, The Intelligent Investor. Graham's defensive investment strategy mainly focused on a "margin of safety" and reducing losses as opposed to maximizing gains. The Graham number was developed based on this concept to quickly value a stock.

Graham himself never gave a specific formula or equation. The Graham number was derived from guidelines he laid down in the book. The formula has since become widely used by value investors as a quick screening tool to identify potentially undervalued stocks.

== Limitations ==
The Graham number has several limitations that investors should consider:

- No growth consideration: The formula does not account for future earnings growth, making it unsuitable for evaluating growth stocks, particularly in sectors such as technology where much of a company's value derives from expected future earnings.
- Requires positive values: The equation requires both positive earnings per share and positive book value per share. Companies with negative earnings or negative equity produce an undefined result under the square root, making the metric inapplicable.
- Sector limitations: The metric is most applicable to industrial and manufacturing companies. It is less useful for financial institutions, REITs, and asset-light businesses where book value may not reflect the company's true economic value.
- Backward-looking: The formula uses historical financial data and does not incorporate forward-looking estimates or qualitative factors such as management quality or competitive advantage.
- Single-point estimate: The Graham number produces a single value and does not account for the range of possible fair values that more sophisticated methods such as discounted cash flow analysis can provide.

Despite these limitations, the Graham number remains a popular initial screening tool among value investors due to its simplicity and its direct connection to Benjamin Graham's investment philosophy.

== See also ==
- Altman Z-score
- Beneish M-score
- Piotroski F-score
- Ohlson O-score
- Fundamental analysis
- Magic formula investing
- Value investing
- Benjamin Graham
- The Intelligent Investor
- Margin of safety
- Price-to-earnings ratio
- Price-to-book ratio
