= Over-investing =

Investing more in an asset than its market value justifies

Over-investing in finance, particularly personal finance, refers to the practice of investing more into an asset than its worth on the open market. It is cited most frequently in reference to expensive personal consumable investments, such as houses, automobiles, and trailers.

== Example ==
Suppose a homeowner makes additions or improvements to their house to the point that the owner has invested considerably more than the market value of other houses in that area. In that case, they likely have over-invested in that house. The "neighbourhood effect" serves to devalue the house so that it is worth less than what has been invested in it. Another example is a person who buys a used car for $2,000 and spends another $2,000 on repairs, even though the 10-year-old car will never be worth more than $3,000 on the open market; they may have over-invested in the car by $1000.

== Avoiding ==
Over-investing typically occurs in assets that are partly investment goods and partially consumption goods. Houses and cars are investment goods in the sense that the purchaser expects to be able to resell the asset in the future. They are also consumption goods because the owner can use the asset while he owns it. It is because of this consumption component that people tend to over-invest. They use criteria other than purely financial ones when deciding how much to invest in the asset. They are prepared to spend more on a house or car than it is worth on the open market because they derive benefits from using them. Because of the confusion between consuming and investing, they may over-invest or under-invest compared to what they would do if the investment were clear. Another major problem is that people spend more on consumption value (such as home rent) because they own the asset and mistakenly think that they are investing when they are actually consuming a house bigger than the one they would normally rent. Although they gain something from consuming more since it is more than they would normally consume, they are wasting some money on something they would not normally buy, thus over-investing by over-consuming.

== Home improvements and market value ==
In residential real estate, over-investing may occur when the cost of improvements exceeds the amount that the improvements add to the property's market value. Home valuations generally compare the property with sales information for similar homes in the same area, so the resale value of improvements may be limited by local comparable sales.

A highly improved property may not recover the full cost of its improvements if local comparable sales do not support a higher valuation. This can occur even when the improvements increase the property's usefulness or appeal to the owner, because appraised value is based on market evidence rather than the owner's cost alone.

== See also ==
- Burnout
- Buyer's remorse
- Cathexis
- Fool's gold
- Kelo v. City of New London - Keto over-invested into her home, and lost her investment when her house was sold for fair market value
- List of finance topics
- Misplaced loyalty
- Opportunity cost
- Overtraining
- Ripoff
- Sunk-cost fallacy
- Time sink
