= Adjusted present value =

Valuation separating financing effects

APV formula

APV = Unlevered NPV of Free Cash Flows and assumed Terminal Value + NPV of Interest Tax Shield and assumed Terminal Value: The discount rate used in the first part is the return on assets or return on equity if unlevered; The discount rate used in the second part is the cost of debt financing by period. In detail:

EBIT – Taxes on EBIT = Net Operating Profit After Tax (NOPAT)

+ Noncash items in EBIT – Working Capital changes – Capital Expenditures and Other Operating Investments =Free Cash Flows

Take Present Value (PV) of FCFs discounted by Return on Assets % (also Return on Unlevered Equity %) + PV of terminal value =Value of Unlevered Assets

+ Excess cash and other assets =Value of Unlevered Firm (i.e., firm value without financing effects or benefit of interest tax shield)

+ Present Value of Debt's Periodic Interest Tax Shield discounted by Cost of Debt Financing % =Value of Levered Firm

– Value of Debt =Value of Levered Equity or APV

The value from the interest tax shield assumes the company is profitable enough to deduct the interest expense. If not, adjust this part for when the interest can be deducted for tax purposes.

Adjusted present value (APV) is a valuation method introduced in 1974 by Stewart Myers. The idea is to value the project as if it were all equity financed ("unleveraged"), and to then add the present value of the tax shield of debt – and other side effects.

Technically, an APV valuation model looks similar to a standard DCF model. However, instead of WACC, cash flows would be discounted at the unlevered cost of equity, and tax shields at either the cost of debt (Myers) or following later academics also with the unlevered cost of equity. APV and the standard DCF approaches should give the identical result if the capital structure remains stable.

According to Myers, the value of the levered firm (Value levered, Vl) is equal to the value of the firm with no debt (Value unlevered, Vu) plus the present value of the tax savings due to the tax deductibility of interest payments, the so-called value of the tax shield (VTS). Myers proposes calculating the VTS by discounting the tax savings at the cost of debt (Kd). The argument is that the risk of the tax saving arising from the use of debt is the same as the risk of the debt.

The method is to calculate the NPV of the project as if it is all-equity financed (so called "base case"). Then the base-case NPV is adjusted for the benefits of financing. Usually, the main benefit is a tax shield resulted from tax deductibility of interest payments. Another benefit can be a subsidized borrowing at sub-market rates. The APV method is especially effective when a leveraged buyout case is considered since the company is loaded with an extreme amount of debt, so the tax shield is substantial.

== See also ==
- Leverage (finance)
- Hamada's equation
