= Pure play =

Type of company

A pure play company focuses solely on a particular product or activity. Investing in a pure play company can be considered as investing in a particular commodity or product of a company.

Pure play firms either specialize in a specific niche, or have little to no vertical integration. For example, a coffee shop may call itself a "pure play" restaurant, and a factory that only produces goods (not designing or selling to consumers) may refer to itself as a pure play manufactory.

Companies that transact exclusively via e-commerce and have no brick and mortar retail spaces may be referred to as pure play online retailers.

== Pure play method ==
In finance, the "pure play method" is an approach used to estimate the cost of equity capital of private companies, which involves examining the beta coefficient of other public and single focused companies. See also Hamada's equation.

Here, when estimating a private company A's equity beta coefficient, the equity beta coefficient of a public company B is needed; the latter can be calculated by regressing the return on B's stock on the return on the relevant stock index. The following calculation is then applied to return the beta coefficient of company A.

Unlevered Beta of B = Equity Beta of B / (1 + DE_{B} × (1 − Tax Rate_{B}))

Equity Beta A = Unlevered Beta of B × (1 + DE_{A} × (1 − Tax Rate_{A}))

where DE_{A} and DE_{B} are the debt to equity ratios of company A and B respectively.

== Pure play foundries ==
Pure play foundries, such as TSMC and GlobalFoundries, have no in-house design capabilities, and fabricate integrated circuits (ICs) for fabless semiconductor companies, such as Qualcomm, Broadcom, Xilinx, Nvidia, among others. Integrated device manufacturer (IDM) foundries, such as Intel, IBM, NEC, Texas Instruments and Samsung, provide both foundry design services and IC fabrication.

== Pure play e-retailers ==
Compared to traditional retail stores, pure play e-retailers can serve a wider audience without physical boundaries and distance, and may target specific customer groups without the high cost of maintaining physical stores.

Compared to companies that integrate both offline and online, pure online internet retails do not have company brand recognition and reputation at the start-up stage, and customers are unable to touch, examine and test real products before buying them. The online shopping experience foregoes human contact with consumers.

== See also ==
- Diversification (strategy)
