= Earnings response coefficient =

Financial Term

In financial economics, finance, and accounting, the earnings response coefficient, or ERC, is the estimated relationship between equity returns and the unexpected portion of (i.e., new information in) companies' earnings announcements.

== Development ==
Arbitrage pricing theory describes the theoretical relationship between information that is known to market participants about a particular equity (e.g., a common stock share of a particular company) and the price of that equity. Under the strong form of the efficient market hypothesis, equity prices are expected in the aggregate to reflect all relevant information at a given time. Market participants with superior information are expected to exploit that information until share prices have effectively impounded the information. Therefore, in the aggregate, a portion of changes in a company's share price is expected to result from changes in the relevant information available to the market. The ERC is an estimate of the change in a company's stock price due to the information provided in a company's earnings announcement.

The ERC is expressed mathematically as follows:

$UR = a + b(\text{ern}-u) + e$

UR = the unexpected return
a = benchmark rate
b = earning response coefficient
(ern-u) = (actual earnings less expected earnings) = unexpected earnings
e = random movement

Earnings response coefficient research attempts to identify and explain the differential market response to earnings information of different firms. An Earnings response coefficient measures the extent of security’s abnormal market return in response to the unexpected component of reported earnings of the firm issuing that security. and

The relationship between stock returns to profit to determine the extent of the response that occurs to as the Earnings Response Coefficient (ERC). Some studies reveal there are four factors that affect Earnings Response Coefficient (ERC), namely : beta, capital structure, persistence and growth.

== Reasons ==
Reasons for differential market response:

1. Beta: The more risk related to the firm's expected returns the lower will be the investor's reactions to a given amount of unexpected earnings.(Note: beta shows risk of a security so you can assume that a high beta means a high risk).
2. Capital structure: ERC for a highly leveraged firm is lower than for a firm with little or no debt, Any good news passed on means that the debt holders get this benefit instead of the investors. (Thus it is important to disclose the nature & magnitude of financial instruments including off-balance sheet).
3. Persistence: Source of increase in current earnings affects the ERC: If earnings are expected to persist into the future this will result in a higher ERC. If the component in the earnings is non-persistent (i.e. unusual, non recurring items) this will result in lower ERC.
4. Accruals quality: The manager has considerable control over the amounts and timing of accruals. If the manager uses this control over accruals to influence the amount of reported net income, they are called discretionary accruals.
5. Growth Opportunities: Suppose that current net income reveals unexpectedly high profitability for some of the firm's recent investment projects. This may indicate to the market that the firm will enjoy strong growth in the future, hence ERC will be high.
6. The informativeness of price: Because prices lead earnings, and market prices aggregates all publicly known information about the firm, much of which the accounting system recognizes with a lag. Consequently, the more informative price is, the less the information content of current accounting earnings will be, other things equal, hence the lower the ERC.

== Use & Debate ==
ERCs are used primarily in research in accounting and finance. In particular, ERCs have been used in research in positive accounting, a branch of financial accounting research, as they theoretically describe how markets react to different information events. Research in Finance has used ERCs to study, among other things, how different investors react to information events.

There is some debate concerning the true nature and strength of the ERC relationship. As demonstrated in the above model, the ERC is generally considered to be the slope coefficient of a linear equation between unexpected earnings and equity return. However, certain research results suggest that the relationship is nonlinear. and

== See also ==
- Capital asset pricing model
- Post earnings announcement drift
- Clean surplus accounting
