= Residual income valuation =

Equity valuation method based on the present value of future residual income

Residual income valuation (RIV), also called the residual income model or residual income method (RIM), is an approach to equity valuation that formally accounts for the cost of equity capital. Here, "residual" means in excess of any opportunity costs measured relative to the book value of shareholders' equity; residual income (RI), or economic profit, is then the income generated by a firm after accounting for the true cost of capital. The approach is largely analogous to the EVA/MVA based approach, with similar logic and advantages.

== History ==
The concept of measuring business performance as profit less an opportunity cost charge for the use of the funds employed in earning the profit dates back to Robert Hamilton who published An Introduction to Merchandize in 1777 in Edinburgh, Scotland. Hamilton's treatment may have its origins in Adam Smith's, The Wealth of Nations (first edition in 1776).

In the United States, Alfred Marshall, in Principles of Economics, explained in 1890 that for firms to create wealth they must earn more than the cost of their debt and equity. General Motors applied the concept in the 1920s. (Note: The DuPont company began using DuPont analysis in the 1920s.) It was called "excess earnings" by Canning (1929) and Preinreich (1938). (Note: During the first half of the 20th century, debates took place in the United States and in the United Kingdom about how to evaluate investment decisions from a theoretical and commercial perspective. This led to Paul Samuelson's discounted utility model in 1937, based on a single discount rate compounded across time periods.) In the 1950’s General Electric labeled it “residual income” and applied it as a performance measure to their decentralized divisions.

In Divisional Performance: Measurement and Control, D. Solomons (1965) suggested that residual income be used as an internal performance measure and Robert Anthony (1973) suggested that it be an external performance measure.

Residual Income valuation was further developed by Edwards & Bell (1961), Peasnell (1982), and Ohlson (1995).

== Concept ==
The underlying idea is that investors require a rate of return from their resources – i.e. equity – under the control of the firm's management, compensating them for their opportunity cost and accounting for the level of risk resulting. This rate of return is the cost of equity, and a formal equity cost must be subtracted from net income. Consequently, to create shareholder value, management must generate returns at least as great as this cost. Thus, although a company may report a profit on its income statement, it may actually be economically unprofitable. It is thus possible that a value deemed positive using a traditional discounted cash flow (DCF) approach may be negative here. RI-based valuation is therefore a valuable complement to more traditional techniques.

== Calculation of residual income ==
The cost of equity is typically calculated using the CAPM, although other approaches such as APT are also used. The currency charge to be subtracted is then simply

Equity Charge = Equity Capital x Cost of Equity,

and

Residual income = Net Income − Equity Charge.

== Valuation formula ==
Using the residual income approach, the value of a company's stock can be calculated as the sum of its book value today (i.e. at time $0$) and the present value of its expected future residual income, discounted at the cost of equity, $r$, resulting in the general formula:

$$V_0 = BV_0 + \sum_{t=1}^{\infty} { RI_t \over (1+r)^t }$$

Here various adjustments to the balance sheet book value may be required; see Clean surplus accounting.

More typically, the company is assumed to achieve maturity or "constant growth", at time $m$, and the below formulae are applied instead. (Note that the value will remain identical: the adjustment is a "telescoping" device). In the first step, analysts commonly employ the Perpetuity Growth Model to calculate the terminal value — although various, more formal approaches are also applied — which returns:

$$T_{m} =  {RI_{m} \over (r-g)}$$.

In the second step, the RI valuation is then:

$$V_0 = BV_0 + \sum_{t=1}^{m-1} { RI_t \over (1+r)^t } + {T_{m} \over (1+r)^{m-1}}$$.

== Comparison with other valuation methods ==
As can be seen, the residual income valuation formula is similar to the dividend discount model (DDM) (and to other discounted cash flow (DCF) valuation models), substituting future residual earnings for dividend (or free cash) payments (and the cost of equity for the weighted average cost of capital).

However, the RI-based approach is most appropriate when a firm is not paying dividends or exhibits an unpredictable dividend pattern, and / or when it has negative free cash flow many years out, but is expected to generate positive cash flow at some point in the future. Further, value is recognized earlier under the RI approach, since a large part of the stock's intrinsic value is recognized immediately – current book value per share – and residual income valuations are thus less sensitive to terminal value.

At the same time, in addition to the accounting considerations mentioned above, the RI approach will not generally hold if there are expected changes in shares outstanding or if the firm plans to bring in "new" shareholders who derive a net benefit from their capital contributions.

Although EVA is similar to residual income, there will be technical differences between EVA and RI, specifically Stern Stewart & Co, originators of EVA, recommend a fairly large number of adjustments to NOPAT before the methodology may be applied. See Economic value added § Comparison with other approaches.

== See also ==
- Enterprise value
- Valuation (finance) § Net asset value method
- Clean surplus accounting
- T-model
- Shareholder value
