= Debt Diet =

Debt management plan

The debt diet refers to a debt management plan made popular by a multipart series for The Oprah Winfrey Show, first airing on February 17, 2006. In the series, Oprah Winfrey teamed up with financial experts Jean Chatzky, Glinda Bridgforth and David Bach to create a step-by-step plan demonstrating how to get out of debt.

A debt diet is a plan or strategy for reducing or eliminating debt. It typically involves creating a budget, setting financial goals, and making changes to spending and saving habits in order to pay off debt and improve overall financial health.

A debt diet may be undertaken by individuals or households who are struggling with high levels of debt or who want to improve their financial management skills. It can be a challenging process, but it can also be very rewarding, as reducing or eliminating debt can lead to improved financial stability and greater peace of mind.

== Plan ==
The debt diet is an eight-step plan:

- Debt Diet Step 1: How much debt do you really have?
- Debt Diet Step 2: Track your spending and find extra money to pay down the debt
- Debt Diet Step 3: Learn to play the credit card game
- Debt Diet Step 4: Stop spending
- Debt Diet Step 5: Create a monthly spending plan
- Debt Diet Step 6: Grow your income
- Debt Diet Step 7: Prioritize your debts and increase your credit score
- Debt Diet Step 8: Understand your spending issues and save

== See also ==
- Debt club
- Debt consolidation
- Debt counseling
- Debtors Anonymous
- Debt-snowball method
- Bankruptcy
