= Uncompensated risk =

In investments, level of additional risk

In investment, uncompensated risk is the level of additional risk for which no additional returns are generated and, when taking systematic withdrawals, make the probability of failure unacceptably high. It is reduced by diversifying investment.

== Relation to diversification ==
Uncompensated risk is often associated with concentration risk, meaning risk that can be reduced through diversification without necessarily reducing expected return. A portfolio heavily concentrated in a single stock or a small number of holdings may be exposed to steep losses if those investments underperform.

In this sense, uncompensated risk refers to additional exposure that is specific to a company, sector, or concentrated position, rather than broad market risk. Maintaining a diversified portfolio is commonly presented as a way to reduce this type of risk.
