= Debt-to-capital ratio =

A company's debt-to-capital ratio (D/C ratio) is the ratio of its total debt to its total capital, its debt and equity combined. The ratio measures a company's capital structure, financial solvency, and degree of leverage, at a particular point in time. The data to calculate the ratio are found on the balance sheet.

Practitioners use different definitions of debt:

- Any interest-bearing liability to qualify.
- All liabilities, including accounts payable and deferred income.
- Long-term debt and its associated currently due portion (measures capital structure).

Companies alter their D/C ratio by issuing more shares, buying back shares, issuing additional debt, or retiring debt.

== Definition and details ==
A measurement of a company's financial leverage, calculated as the company's debt divided by its total capital. Debt includes all short-term and long-term obligations. Total capital includes the company's debt and shareholders' equity, which includes common stock, preferred stock, minority interest and net debt.

Calculated as:

Debt-To-Capital Ratio = Debt / (Shareholder's Equity + Debt)

Companies can finance their operations through either debt or equity. The debt-to-capital ratio gives users an idea of a company's financial structure, or how it is financing its operations, along with some insight into its financial strength.

Because this is a non-GAAP measure, in practice, there are many variations of this ratio. Therefore, it is important to pay close attention when reading what is or isn't included in the ratio on a company's financial statements.

Note: Above section is copied from Investopedia website.

== Interpretation ==
The higher the debt-to-capital ratio, the more debt the company has compared to its equity. This tells investors whether a company is more prone to using debt financing or equity financing. A company with high debt-to-capital ratios, compared to a general or industry average, may show weak financial strength because the cost of these debts may weigh on the company and increase its default risk.

Similarly, a lower debt-to-capital ratio will indicate that significant portion of the company's capital is funded via Equity Capital. Generally, a company with lower debt-to-capital have greater flexibility in terms of raising additional capital via Debt. Hence, management tries to maintain a healthy capital structure that does not jeopardize the company Solvency.

== See also ==
- Debt-to-equity ratio
- Financial ratio
