= T-model =

Connects fundamentals with investment return

In finance, the T-model is a formula that states the returns earned by holders of a company's stock in terms of accounting variables obtainable from its financial statements. The T-model connects fundamentals with investment return, allowing an analyst to make projections of financial performance and turn those projections into a required return that can be used in investment selection.

== Formula ==
Mathematically the T-model is as follows:

$$\mathit T = \mathit g + \frac{\mathit ROE - \mathit g} {\mathit PB} +  \frac{\Delta PB}{PB} \mathit(1 + g)$$

where $T$ = total return from the stock over a period (appreciation + "distribution yield" — see below);

$g$ = the growth rate of the company's book value during the period;

$PB$ = the ratio of price / book value at the beginning of the period.

$ROE$ = the company's return on equity, i.e. earnings during the period / book value;

== Derivation ==
The return a shareholder receives from owning a stock is:

$(2) \mathit T = \frac{\mathit D} {\mathit P} + \frac{\Delta P}{P}$

Where $\mathit P$ = beginning stock price, $\Delta P$ = price appreciation or decline, and $\mathit D$ = distributions, i.e. dividends plus or minus the cash effect of company share issuance/buybacks. Consider a company whose sales and profits are growing at rate g. The company funds its growth by investing in plant and equipment and working capital so that its asset base also grows at g, and debt/equity ratio is held constant, so that net worth grows at g. Then the amount of earnings retained for reinvestment will have to be gBV. After paying dividends, there may be an excess:

$\mathit XCF = \mathit E - \mathit Div - \mathit gBV \,$

where XCF = excess cash flow, E = earnings, Div = dividends, and BV = book value. The company may have money left over after paying dividends and financing growth, or it may have a shortfall. In other words, XCF may be positive (company has money with which it can repurchase shares) or negative (company must issue shares).

Assume that the company buys or sells shares in accordance with its XCF, and that a shareholder sells or buys enough shares to maintain her proportionate holding of the company's stock. Then the portion of total return due to distributions can be written as $\frac{\mathit Div} {\mathit P} + \frac{\mathit XCF} {\mathit P}$. Since $\mathit ROE = \frac{\mathit E} {\mathit BV}$ and $\mathit PB = \frac{\mathit P} {\mathit BV}$ this simplifies to:

$(3) \frac{\mathit D} {\mathit P} = \frac{\mathit ROE - \mathit g} {\mathit PB}$

Now we need a way to write the other portion of return, that due to price change, in terms of PB. For notational clarity, temporarily replace PB with A and BV with B. Then P $\equiv$ AB.

We can write changes in P as:

$\mathit P + \Delta \mathit P = (\mathit A + \Delta \mathit A ) ( \mathit B + \Delta \mathit B ) \, = \mathit AB + \mathit B \Delta \mathit A + \mathit A \Delta \mathit B + \Delta \mathit A \Delta \mathit B \,$

Subtracting P $\equiv$ AB from both sides and then dividing by P $\equiv$ AB, we get:

$\frac{\Delta P}{P} = \frac{\Delta \mathit B}{\mathit B} + \frac{\Delta \mathit A}{\mathit A} \left ( \mathit 1 + \frac{\Delta \mathit B}{\mathit B} \right )$

A is PB; moreover, we recognize that $\frac{\Delta \mathit B}{\mathit B} = \mathit g$, so it turns out that:

$(4) \frac{\Delta P}{P} = \mathit g + \frac{\Delta PB}{PB} \mathit(1 + g)$

Substituting (3) and (4) into (2) gives (1), the T-Model.

== Cash-flow variation ==
In 2003, Estep published a version of the T-model that does not rely on estimates of return on equity, but rather is driven by cash items: cash flow from the income statement, and asset and liability accounts from the balance sheet. The cash-flow T-model is:

$\mathit T = \frac {\mathit CF}{\mathit P} + \boldsymbol {\Phi} g + \frac{\Delta PB}{PB} \mathit(1 + g)$

where

$\mathit CF = cash flow \,$ $\mbox{(net income + depreciation + all other non-cash charges),} \,$

and

$\boldsymbol {\Phi} = \frac{\mathit MktCap - gross assets + total liabilities}{\mathit MktCap}$

He provided a proof that this model is mathematically identical to the original T-model, and gives identical results under certain simplifying assumptions about the accounting used. In practice, when used as a practical forecasting tool it may be preferable to the standard T-model, because the specific accounting items used as input values are generally more robust (that is, less susceptible to variation due to differences in accounting methods), hence possibly easier to estimate.

== Relationship to other models ==
Some familiar valuation formulas and techniques can be understood as simplified cases of the T-model. For example, consider the case of a stock selling exactly at book value (PB = 1) at the beginning and end of the holding period. The third term of the T-Model becomes zero, and the remaining terms simplify to: $\mathit T = \mathit g + \frac{\mathit ROE - \mathit g} {1} = ROE$

Since $\mathit ROE = \frac{\mathit E}{\mathit BV}$ and we are assuming in this case that $\mathit BV = \mathit P \,$, $\mathit T = \frac{\mathit E}{\mathit P}$, the familiar earnings yield. In other words, earnings yield would be a correct estimate of expected return for a stock that always sells at its book value; in that case, the expected return would also equal the company's ROE.

Consider the case of a company that pays the portion of earnings not required to finance growth, or put another way, growth equals the reinvestment rate 1 – D/E. Then if PB doesn't change:

$\mathit T = \mathit g + \frac{\mathit ROE - \mathit ROE (1 - D/E)} {\mathit PB}$

Substituting E/BV for ROE, this turns into:

$\mathit T = \mathit g + \frac{D} {\mathit P}$

This is the standard Gordon "yield plus growth" model. It will be a correct estimate of T if PB does not change and the company grows at its reinvestment rate.

If PB is constant, the familiar price–earnings ratio can be written as:

$\frac{\mathit P}{\mathit E} = \frac{\mathit ROE - \mathit g}{\mathit ROE (\mathit T - \mathit g)}$

From this relationship we recognize immediately that P–E cannot be related to growth by a simple rule of thumb such as the so-called "PEG ratio" $\frac{\mathit P/E}{g}$; it also depends on ROE and the required return, T.

The T-model is also closely related to the P/B-ROE model of Wilcox

== Use ==
When ex post values for growth, price/book, etc. are plugged in, the T-Model gives a close approximation of actually realized stock returns. Unlike some proposed valuation formulas, it has the advantage of being correct in a mathematical sense (see derivation); however, this by no means guarantees that it will be a successful stock-picking tool.

Still, it has advantages over commonly used fundamental valuation techniques such as price–earnings or the simplified dividend discount model: it is mathematically complete, and each connection between company fundamentals and stock performance is explicit so that the user can see where simplifying assumptions have been made.

Some of the practical difficulties involved with financial forecasts stem from the many vicissitudes possible in the calculation of earnings, the numerator in the ROE term. With an eye toward making forecasting more robust, in 2003 Estep published a version of the T-Model driven by cash items: cash flow, gross assets, and total liabilities.

Note that all "fundamental valuation methods" differ from economic models such as the capital asset pricing model and its various descendants; fundamental models attempt to forecast return from a company's expected future financial performance, whereas CAPM-type models regard expected return as the sum of a risk-free rate plus a premium for exposure to return variability.

== See also ==
- Residual income valuation
- Clean surplus accounting
