= Petition mill =

Type of fraud

A petition mill is a fraud in which the perpetrator poses as a financial advisor, sometimes as a credit counselor or paralegal, filing hastily prepared bankruptcy documents in the name of victims who come to the advisor as clients. The bankruptcy filing is often both incomplete and inappropriate for the victim's condition; and, often, the victim does not even realize that a bankruptcy has been filed.

== Method and victims ==
Victims are people in financial trouble who believe they are becoming clients of a professional operation. The fraudster promises to make the foreclosures, evictions, repossessions, high interest rates on loans, and other debt problems go away. The victim pays a large initial fee for the fraudster's services, and the fraudster usually has the victim sign blank documents. Sometimes the victim is also told to make their usual payments directly to the fraudulent advisor instead of the real creditors, or to transfer their real estate to the fraudster. The payments are stolen by the fraudster instead of being used to pay victims' debts, and real estate is often deeded in fractional shares to other victims unknowingly under bankruptcy, complicating ownership to make foreclosures even more difficult by having multiple (fraudulent) bankruptcies involved in the property.

In other petition mill schemes, the fraudster simply creates summary bankruptcy filings for the victim. The victim is then told to file pro se in court and deny that anyone helped prepare the documents.

== Warning signs ==
According to the United States Trustee Manual, volume 5, chapter 5, the following are warning signs of a petition mill scheme:

1. Pro se bankruptcy petition where the debtor says no one assisted him/her, but the debtor is clearly unfamiliar with the bankruptcy system
2. Pro se petition filed despite the debtor denying filing bankruptcy
3. Debtor failing to attend the section 341 meeting, where creditors and the United States Trustee first meet with the debtor
4. "Face sheet" (suspiciously small) filing with a single creditor listed, usually the mortgagee or the landlord
5. Debtor facing eviction, foreclosure, or repossession notice
6. Pattern of pro se debtors with identical paperwork form, style, and general content
7. Pattern of complaints from mortgagees or landlords
8. Debtors or others being solicited by petition mills that stress stopping evictions, etc.
9. Complaints by debtor that he/she has been making rent/mortgage/car payments to a third party (instead of to the original creditors)
10. Advertising in budget papers and using flyers to advertise bankruptcy and divorce assistance at a low, fixed fee
11. Implications that attorneys are supervising or approving the service
12. Requests for payment of filing fee in installments
13. Assets or liabilities not scheduled (filed in proper format)
14. Failure to properly fill out or file schedules
15. Use of chapter 7 (complete liquidation) when chapter 13 (reorganization) is clearly feasible

== See also ==
- Credit counseling
- Fraudulent conveyance
