= Clean surplus accounting =

Valuing firms by changes in book value excluding shareholder transactions

The clean surplus accounting method provides elements of a forecasting model that yields price as a function of earnings, expected returns, and change in book value. The theory's primary use is to estimate the value of a company's shares (instead of discounted dividend/cash flow approaches). The secondary use is to estimate the cost of capital, as an alternative to e.g. the CAPM. The "clean surplus" is calculated by not including transactions with shareholders (such as dividends, share repurchases or share offerings) when calculating returns; whereas standard accounting for financial statements requires that the change in book value equal earnings minus dividends (net of capital changes).

== Theory ==
The market value (MV) of the firm—and hence security returns—can be expressed in terms of balance sheet and income statement components, as below. This allows reading the firm's value directly from the balance sheet. The theory assumes ideal conditions. Here:

The market value of a firm = net book value of the firm’s net assets + present value of future abnormal earnings (goodwill).

Logic:

1. Goodwill is calculated as the difference between actual earnings and expected earnings ("abnormal earnings").
  - Actual earnings are the “clean surplus” - this ensures that all gains or losses go through the income statement. The impact of fair values is recognized in earnings.
  - Expected earnings = opening shareholders' equity X the firm's cost of capital (similar to accretion of discount.)
2. Finally, convert book value to market value as above: firm value = net worth of the firm + calculated estimate of firm's goodwill.

=== Applicability ===
This approach provides a relatively "quick and dirty" method to calculate the market value of a firm - which should be (approximately) the same as a valuation based on discounted dividends or cash flows. The model provides one estimate of the firm's shares, useful for comparison to their market value. Research by Frankel & Lee shows that this ratio provides a good predictor of share returns for 2–3 years into the future.

The model is applicable when abnormal earnings do not "persist" (i.e. no goodwill); in this case all gains and losses go through the income statement, and the firm's fair value appears on the balance sheet. The investor can then calculate expected earnings directly from the balance sheet, as above. However, if persistence is assumed, the income statement will have emerging "information content": this increases the impact of the income statement on firm value, and the method is less applicable. (Greater persistence similarly translates to a greater Earnings response coefficient.)

== See also ==
- Valuation (finance)#Net asset value method
- Residual income valuation
- T-model
