= Large and complex financial institutions =

Large and complex financial institutions (LCFI) are systemically important financial institutions, also referred to colloquially as bulge bracket banks, that if they failed would cause a Systemic banking crisis. The term is used in the context of systemic risk which concerns central banks, financial regulators and the Bank for International Settlements and has led to the term too big to fail.

Basel III is an example of a recommendation issued to limit the risk of failure in large and complex financial institutions.

Bank "Risk" departments enforce "BIS 1" and "BIS 2" risk accounting regimes. These are complex sets of rules allowing the bank – and its regulators – to know how much money is at risk in trading positions, no matter how complex, and how much 'regulatory' capital' must be set aside as a buffer against each trade going sour. They also try to avoid concentration risk with one counterparty.

That last measure – the counterparty risk limit – is every market player's best protection against the failure of a trading partner. And if that player was the only company hit by their trading partner's bankruptcy, or one of a few dozen players caught in the same position, they would all be safe. However, if every market player, everywhere and in every market took the same hit the results can be the failure of the financial system or 'systemic risk'.

== History ==
Central bankers have had to deal with large institution going bust, an example is Barings in 1995. A concern for financial regulators has been to ensure that depositors are protected from the failure of a retail bank, but the regulators' main concern with an investment bank is to ensure that there isn't a damaging loss of confidence in the banking system, and that all the trades, transactions and all the types of financial contracts are wound up in an orderly way. If they are not, and all the traders and investors are suddenly forced to meet their obligations or liquidate their positions on the same day, there would be a crisis in the market and many institutions, rather than just the one, would probably go bust or at least suffer substantial losses in a dangerous spiral of falling prices and forced selling.

There are many published articles on Long-Term Capital Management failed, but very few on the systemic risk of all LTCM's counterparties attempt to unwind their positions at once. This is why the Federal Reserve Bank of New York intervened and organised a $3 billion bailout.

Worse, at least one major European bank had 'hedged' or laid off risk on a significant percentage of its trading book by derivatives trades with LTCM but was a significant investor in LTCM itself. In other words, they had sold on the risks to LTCM, while buying back into them. Even without such errors, there is the worry that positions we think are hedged (effectively 'insured' against adverse market movements) might lose that protection when the counterparty who sold those derivatives goes broke. An event which would, by its very nature, occur on the very day the markets go crazy.

Nobody knows what would happen if one of the world's largest banks became severely distressed and was forced to suspend trading, except to say that it would be far worse than long-term capital management: firstly, because they have ongoing trades with every significant market player, everywhere; secondly, because the sums of money are so much larger. A bulge-bracket bank will, on any given day, have over a ten trillion dollars of open trades on the foreign exchange markets and in derivatives.

== See also ==
- Bank run
- Concentration risk
- Financial crisis
- Prudential regulation
- Systemic risk
- Systemically important financial institution
