= Paper valuation =

Value of private, non-tradeable shares

Example

"Owner A owns 100% of a privately held company and wants to sell 5% of the company's total shares for a sum of $10,000. Buyer A is willing to purchase 5% of Owner A's shares for $10,000. What this means is:

Paper valuation of the entire company becomes $10,000 / 5% = $200,000. Owner A receives $10,000 cash and becomes $190,000 richer on paper ($200,000 X 95% of shares). Buyer A now owns 5% of a company he wanted to own a part of."

Paper valuation is the value of privately held shares that is not directly tradeable at an exchange. This notional value, though, is as yet untested on real buyers.

The opposite of paper value is exchangeable value, and is the value that is directly monetizable as long as there is a willing buyer and a willing seller.

Thus, if the aside exchange was made as an "exchange valuation" this new company valuation would be tradable directly on the stock exchange. One problem with paper valuation is that it is not that easy to monetize in a short time period.

This valuation concept is a cornerstone in the stock exchange world. Value exchange is paramount to its existence.

== Liquidity and valuation uncertainty ==
Paper valuation is commonly associated with private-company shares because those shares are not usually traded in a public market. Securities of private companies are generally less liquid than exchange-traded securities because there may be fewer buyers and sellers, and resale restrictions may apply to securities acquired in exempt offerings. Restricted securities are not freely tradeable and may carry legends or contractual limits that restrict resale.

Because there may be no active market price, a paper valuation may differ from the amount that shareholders can actually realise in a sale. In private placements, investors are warned that restricted securities may not be easy to resell and may need to be held for an indefinite period unless registration or an exemption from registration is available.

== See also ==
- Pre-money valuation
- Post-money valuation
