= Accrual bond =

An accrual bond is a fixed-interest bond that is issued at its face value and repaid at the end of the maturity period together with the accrued interest. However, another definition states that the interest periods maybe paid periodically.

In Germany, the accrued interest is compounded.

In contrast to zero-coupon bonds, accrual bonds have a clearly stated coupon rate.

== See also ==
The dictionary definition of Accrual bond at Wiktionary
