= Tax shield =

Reduction in taxable income achieved through allowable deductible expenses

A tax shield is the reduction in income taxes that results from taking an allowable deduction from taxable income. For example, because interest on debt is a tax-deductible expense, taking on debt creates a tax shield. Since a tax shield is a way to save cash flows, it increases the value of the business, and it is an important aspect of business valuation.

== Example ==
=== Case A ===
- Consider one unit of investment that costs $1,000 and returns $1,100 at the end of year 1, i.e. a 10% return on investment before taxes.
- Now assume tax rate of 20%.
- If an investor pays $1,000 of capital, at the end of the year, he will have ($1,000 return of capital, $100 income and –$20 tax) $1,080. He earned net income of $80, or 8% return on capital.

The concept was originally added to the methodology proposed by Franco Modigliani and Merton Miller for the calculation of the weighted average cost of capital of a corporation.

=== Case B ===
- Consider the investor now has an option to borrow $4,000 at 8% interest rate.
- If the investor still pays $1,000 of his initial equity capital, in addition to borrowing $4,000 at the terms above, the investor can purchase 5 units of investment for $5000 total.
- At the end of the year, he will have: ($5,000 return of capital, $500 revenue (due to the 10% return on each unit of investment), –$4,000 repayment of debt, –$320 interest payment, and $(500-320)*20%= $36 tax). Therefore, he is left with $1,144. He earned net income of $144, or 14.4% return on his $1000 initial equity capital.

The reason that he was able to earn additional income is because the cost of debt (i.e. 8% interest rate) is less than the return earned on the investment (i.e. 10%). The 2% difference makes income of $80 and another $100 is made by the return on equity capital. Total income becomes $180 which becomes taxable at 20%, leading to the net income of $144.

=== Value of the Tax Shield ===
In most business valuation scenarios, it is assumed that the business will continue forever. Under this assumption, the value of the tax shield is: (interest bearing debt) x (tax rate).

Using the above examples:

- Assume Case A brings after-tax income of $80 per year, forever.
- Assume Case B brings after-tax income of $144 per year, forever.
- Value of firm = after-tax income / (return of capital), therefore
- Value of firm in Case A: $80/0.08 = $1,000
- Value of firm in Case B: $144/0.08 = $1,800
- Increase in firm value due to borrowing: $1,800 – $1,000 = $800
- Alternatively, debt x tax rate: $4,000 x 20% = $800;

== See also ==
- Adjusted present value
- Cost of capital
- Valuation (finance)
