= Liabilities subject to compromise =

Liabilities subject to compromise refers to the debtors' liabilities, in the US, incurred before the start of Chapter 11 bankruptcy cases.

This amount represents the debtors' estimate of known or potential pre-petition claims to be resolved in connection with the Chapter 11 cases. Such claims remain subject to future adjustments. Virtually all of the corporation's pre-petition debt is in default due to the filing and is included in Liabilities subject to compromise. Payment terms for liabilities subject to compromise are established as part of a plan of reorganization.

== See also ==
- Debt consolidation
- Insolvency
- Liquidation
- Bankruptcy alternatives
