= Cheyette model =

Model in mathematical finance

In mathematical finance, the Cheyette Model is a quasi-Gaussian, quadratic volatility model of interest rates intended to overcome certain limitations of the Heath-Jarrow-Morton framework. By imposing a special time dependent structure on the forward rate volatility function, the Cheyette approach allows for dynamics which are Markovian, in contrast to the general HJM model. This in turn allows the application of standard econometric valuation concepts.

== External links and references ==
- Andersen, L. & Piterbarg, V. (2010). "Chapter 13". Interest Rate Modeling in Three Volumes (1st ed.). Atlantic Financial Press. ISBN 978-0-9844221-0-4. Archived from the original on 2011-02-08.
- Cheyette, O. (1994). Markov representation of the Heath-Jarrow-Morton model (working paper). Berkeley: BARRA Inc.
- Chibane, M. and Law, D. (2013). A quadratic volatility Cheyette model, Risk.net
