= Specific risk =

Risk affecting a particular asset or company, reducible through diversification

In finance, a specific risk is a risk that affects a very small number of assets. This is sometimes referred to as "unsystematic risk". In a balanced portfolio of assets there would be a spread between general market risk and risks specific to individual components of that portfolio. Determination of the extent of exposure to individual risks is made using models such as Treynor-Black in which the optimal share of a security is inversely proportional to the square of its specific risk.

An example would be news that is specific to either one company or a group of companies, such as the loss of a patent or a major natural disaster affecting the company's operation.

Unlike systematic risk or global risk of international markets, specific risk can be diversified away. In fact, most unsystematic risk is removed by holding a portfolio of about twenty-five to thirty securities.

== Diversification and expected return ==
Specific risk is generally not expected to earn a risk premium in a well-diversified portfolio, because it can be reduced by holding assets whose returns are not perfectly correlated. In the capital asset pricing model, expected return is linked to systematic risk, commonly measured by beta, rather than to diversifiable specific risk.

Diversification reduces exposure to events affecting a single company or small group of companies, such as firm-specific operational problems, litigation, or changes in competitive position. Investor education materials describe diversification as spreading investments among different assets to reduce risk, while noting that it does not eliminate all investment risk.
