= Hamada's equation =

Corporate finance equation on separating risk

In corporate finance, Hamada’s equation is an equation used as a way to separate the financial risk of a levered firm from its business risk. The equation combines the Modigliani–Miller theorem with the capital asset pricing model. It is used to help determine the levered beta and, through this, the optimal capital structure of firms. It was named after Robert Hamada, the Professor of Finance behind the theory.

Hamada’s equation relates the beta of a levered firm (a firm financed by both debt and equity) to that of its unlevered (i.e., a firm which has no debt) counterpart. It has proved useful in several areas of finance, including capital structuring, portfolio management and risk management, to name just a few. This formula is commonly taught in MBA Corporate Finance and Valuation classes. It is used to determine the cost of capital of a levered firm based on the cost of capital of comparable firms. Here, the comparable firms would be the ones having similar business risk and, thus, similar unlevered betas as the firm of interest.

== Equation ==
The equation is

$$\beta_{L} = \beta_{U}[1+(1-T)\phi]
\qquad(1)$$

where β_{L} and β_{U} are the levered and unlevered betas, respectively, T the tax rate and $\phi\,\!$ the leverage, defined here as the ratio of debt, D, to equity, E, of the firm.

The importance of Hamada's equation is that it separates the risk of the business, reflected here by the beta of an unlevered firm, β_{U}, from that of its levered counterpart, β_{L}, which contains the financial risk of leverage. Apart from the effect of the tax rate, which is generally taken as constant, the discrepancy between the two betas can be attributed solely to how the business is financed.

The equation is often wrongly thought to hold in general. However, there are several key assumptions behind the Hamada equation:

1. The Hamada formula is based on Modigliani and Miller’s formulation of the tax shield values for constant debt, i.e. when the dollar amount of debt is constant over time. The formulas are not correct if the firm follows a constant leverage policy, i.e. the firm rebalances its capital structure so that debt capital remains at a constant percentage of equity capital, which is a more common and realistic assumption than a fixed dollar debt (Brealey, Myers, Allen, 2010). If the firm is assumed to rebalance its debt-to-equity ratio continuously, the Hamada equation is replaced with the Harris-Pringle equation; if the firm rebalances only periodically, such as once a year, the Miles-Ezzell equation is the one to be used.
2. The beta of debt β_{D} equals zero. This is the case if debt capital has negligible risk that interest and principal payments will not be made when owed. The timely interest payments imply that tax deductions on the interest expense will also be realized—in the period in which the interest is paid.
3. The discount rate used to calculate the tax shield is assumed to be equal to the cost of debt capital (thus, the tax shield has the same risk as debt). This and the constant debt assumption in (1) imply that the tax shield is proportionate to the market value of debt: Tax Shield = T×D.

== Derivation ==
This simplified proof is based on Hamada's original paper (Hamada, R.S. 1972). We know that, the beta of a company is :

$$\beta_{i}=\frac{cov(r_{i},r_{M})}{\sigma^{2}(r_{M})}
\qquad (2)$$

We also know that, the return on equity of a nonleveraged and a leveraged firm is:

$$r_{E,U} = \frac{EBIT(1-T)-\Delta IC}{E_{U}}
\qquad (3)$$

$$r_{E,L} = \frac{EBIT(1-T)-\Delta IC+Debt_{new}-Interest}{E_{L}}
\qquad (4)$$

Where $\Delta IC$ is sum of the net capital expenditure and the change in net working capital. If we substitute the (3) and (4) equation into the (2), then we get these formulas (5), if we suppose that the covariances between the market and the components of equity cash flow are zero (hence β_{∆IC}=β_{Debt_{new}}=β_{Interest}=0), except the covariance between EBIT and the market:

$$\beta_{U} = \frac{cov(\frac{EBIT(1-T)}{E_{U}},r_{M})}{\sigma^{2}(r_{M})}$$

$$\beta_{L} = \frac{cov(\frac{EBIT(1-T)}{E_{L}},r_{M})}{\sigma^{2}(r_{M})}$$

$$E_{L}\beta_{L}  =  E_{U}\beta_{U}\rightarrow\beta_{L}=\frac{E_{U}}{E_{L}}\beta_{U}$$

To get the well-known equation, suppose that the value of a firm's assets and the value of firm's equity are equal, if the firm is completely financed by equity and tax rate is zero. Mathematically this means the value of an unleveraged firm, when tax rate is zero: V_{U}=V_{A}=E_{U}. If we fix the value of the unleveraged firm, and change some equity to debt (D>0), the value of the firm is still the same, because there is no corporate tax. In this situation the value of the leveraged firm is (6):

$$V_{L} = V_{U} = V_{A}=E_{U} = E_{L|T=0}+D$$

If the tax rate is bigger than zero (T>0) and there is financial leverage (D>0), then the leveraged and the unlevaraged firm are not equal because the value of the leveraged firm is bigger by the present value of the tax shield:

$$\sum_{i} \frac{Dr_{D}T}{(1+r_{D})^i}=\frac{Dr_{D}T}{r_{D}}=DT$$,

so (7):

$$V_{L} = V_{\{U,A\}}+DT=E_{U}+DT = E_{L|T=0}+D+DT = E_{L|T>0}+D$$

Where V_{A} is the value of the unleveraged firm's assets, which we fixed in above. From the (7) equation E_{U} is (8)

$$E_{U}=E_{L|T>0}+D-DT$$

Combine the (5) and (8) equation to get the well-known formula for the leveraged and non leveraged equity beta:

$$\beta_{L}=\frac{E_{L}+D-DT}{E_{L}}\beta_{U}=\left[1+\frac{D}{E_{L}}(1-T)\right]\beta_{U} =\beta_{U}[1+(1-T)\phi]$$

Where I is the sum of interest payments, E is Equity, D is Debt, V is the value of a firm category (leveraged or non leveraged), A is assets, M is referred to the market, L means leveraged, U means non leveraged category, r is the return rate and T denotes the tax rate.
