= Outline of corporate finance =

Overview of corporate finance and corporate finance-related topics

The following outline is provided as an overview of and topical guide to corporate finance:

Corporate finance is the area of finance that deals with the sources of funding, and the capital structure of corporations, the actions that managers take to increase the value of the firm to the shareholders, and the tools and analysis used to allocate financial resources.

For finance in general, see Outline of finance.

== Overview ==
- Critical accounting policy – Accounting involving significant judgment and materially affecting financial statements
- Gross margin – Gross profit as a percentage
- Stakeholder (corporate) – Member of groups without whose support the organization would cease to exist
- Yield (finance) – Income return on an investment expressed as a percentage of its value
  - Inverted yield curve – Phenomenon when shorter term bonds yield higher interest rates than longer term bonds

== Aspects ==
- Corporate action – Event initiated by a public company
- Corporate capitalism – Capitalism dominated by large corporations
- Corporate donations – Voluntary donations made by companies
- Corporate responsibility – Business concept
- Corporate sustainability – Business strategy that focuses on sustainability as a core aspect of the business
- Corporate tax – Tax on corporations
  - Franchise tax – Levied by some US states on certain businesses
- Corporate taxonomy – Organization of a company's functions or data into categories
- Corporate trust – Trust arrangement in which a corporation acts as trustee for assets or obligations

== Concepts ==
- Arbitrage – Capitalisation of risk-free opportunities in financial markets
- Beta (finance) – Expected change in price of a stock relative to the whole market
- Earnings at risk – Estimate of the potential impact of market movements on a firm's earnings
- Financial engineering – Application of mathematical and computational practices in finance
- Fundamental analysis – Analysis of a business's financial statements, health, and market
- Going concern – Term for a functioning business
- Scenario analysis – Futures studies / Futures techniques method
- Short-rate model – Interest-rate model describing the stochastic evolution of the instantaneous short rate
- Spread trade – Type of financial purchase on securities

== Models ==
- Bayes' theorem – Mathematical rule for inverting probabilities
- Black-Scholes model – Mathematical model of financial markets
- Dividend discount model – Valuation model that prices a stock by discounting expected future dividends
- Generalized gaussian distribution – Probability distribution
- Linear algebra – Branch of mathematics
- Marginal utility – Benefit derived from consuming a product
- Money flow index – Measurement of stock markets
- Stock market index – Financial metric which investors use to determine market performance

== Strategy ==
- Asset stripping – Selling assets for the sake of equity investors
- Diversification (marketing strategy) – Expansion to new products, services, or markets
- Embedded option – Contract feature giving the holder option-like rights within a host financial instrument
  - Option-adjusted spread – Type of yield spread
- Management buy-in – Of a large interest in a company
- Public offering without listing – Form of public equity offering by non-Japanese firms
- Rebalancing investments – Portfolio rebalancing in finance

== Operations ==
- Corporate budget – Balance sheet or statement of estimated receipts and expenditures
- Captive insurance – Insurance company created and owned by a firm to insure its own risks
- Cost of equity – Required return compensating shareholders for the risk of investing in a company's equity
- Financial management – Management of money in such a manner as to accomplish the objectives of organization
  - Capital management – Management of capital assets and investments
  - Consignment – Selling of one's personal property through a third-party vendor
- Flag of convenience
- FP&A – Accounting and business support structure
  - Corporate finance analyst – Framework for corporate funding, capital structure, and investments
- Operational due diligence (alternative investments) – Investigation of operational risks

== Ratios ==
- Capitalization rate – Real estate valuation measure
- Effective interest rate – Precisely defined interest rate
- Incremental capital-output ratio – Ratio of how much additional investment is needed to generate one unit of extra output
- Loan-to-value ratio – Ratio comparing the size of a loan to the value of the asset securing it
- Operating ratio – Operating expenses as percent of revenue
- P/B ratio – Financial ratio comparing stock price to company book value

== Capital ==
- Abnormal return – Difference between an investment's actual and expected returns
- Capital budgeting – How an organization allocates its cash and resources
  - Accounting rate of return – Financial ratio
  - Internal rate of return – Method of calculating an investment's rate of return
- Capital structure – Mix of funds used to start and sustain a business
- Cost of capital – Cost of a company's funds
- Fixed capital – Long-lived physical assets used repeatedly in production
- Liquid capital – Financial resources readily available for use, typically in cash or near-cash form
  - Money – Object or record accepted as payment
- Venture capital – Form of private-equity financing
- Working capital – Difference between a firm's assets and liabilities used to fund day-to-day operations

== Entities ==
- Benefit corporation – Type of for-profit entity
- Flow-through entity – Business entity which is transparent for tax purposes
- Limited Liability Partnership – Partnership in which some or all partners have limited liabilities
- Offshore company – Company or corporate entity established in an offshore jurisdiction
- Shell corporation – Company with few, if any, actual assets or operations
- Yield co – Company formed to own operating assets and distribute stable cash flows to investors

== Assets ==
- Accounts receivable – Claims for payment held by a business
  - Receivables turnover ratio – Measure of how efficiently a firm collects credit sales from customers
- Capital asset – Property of any kind held by an assessee
- Complementary assets – Resources that enhance the value or usability of another asset when used together
- Factoring (finance) – Financial transaction and a type of debtor finance
- Fixed asset – Assets and property that cannot easily be converted into cash
  - Accelerated depreciation – Accounting method
  - Fixed assets management – Accounting process
    - Fixed asset register
- Intangible asset – Concept in accounting and economics
  - Goodwill (accounting) – Intangible asset recognized in the acquisition of a firm
  - Intellectual property – Ownership of creative expressions and processes
  - Patent – Type of legal protection for an invention

== Liabilities ==
- Accounts payable – Money owed by business to its suppliers
- Credit – Financial term for the trust between parties in transactions with a deferred payment

=== Loans ===
- Back-to-back loan – Loan agreement between entities in two countries
- Business loan – Loan intended for business purposes
- Bond (finance) – Instrument of indebtedness
- Equated monthly installment – Loan repayment variant
- In-house lending – Type of seller financing
- Loan covenant – Condition in a commercial loan or bond agreement
  - Cov-lite – Loan agreements without protective covenants for the lending party
- Shareholder loan – Debt-like form of financing

== Development ==
- Business valuation – Determination of the economic value of a business
  - Net present value – Valuation in finance
  - Sum-of-the-parts analysis – Method of valuation of a company
- Buyout – Investment transaction by which the ownership equity of a company is acquired
- Dividend – Payment made by a corporation to its shareholders
  - Common stock dividend – Dividend paid to holders of a company's common shares
  - Dividend reinvestment plan – Equity investment option
  - Dividend policy – Policies in finance
- Leverage (finance) – Use of borrowed funds in the purchase of an asset
- Mergers and acquisitions – Processes through which companies combine or transfer ownership
  - Consolidation (business) – Merger and acquisition of many smaller companies into much larger ones
- Research and development – General term for activities in connection with corporate or governmental innovation

== Liquidations ==
- Anti-deprivation rule – Legal principle in common law
- Liquidation – Financial process by which a company is ended
  - General assignment – Concept in bankruptcy law
- Qualifying floating charge – Security interest over a fund of changing assets of a legal entity

== Subtypes ==
- Carbon finance – Type of investment in the context of climate action
  - Carbon accounting – Processes used to measure emissions of carbon dioxide equivalents
- Commercial finance – Function of offering loans to businesses
- Social finance – Mobilising capital for projects with social or environmental goals
- Structured finance – Sector of finance that manages leverage and risk
- Supply chain finance – Financing methods that optimize cash flow across buyer–supplier relationships

== Investment ==
- Active management – Investment approach where managers actively select and adjust portfolio holdings
- Clientele effect – Investor shifts caused by policy changes that attract different investor groups
- Disclosed fees – Price to be paid for remuneration for services
- Immunization (finance) – Strategy to minimize effects of changes in interest rates
- Income trust – Vehicle that holds income-generating assets and distributes earnings to unitholders
- Lead arranger – Bank coordinating a syndicated loan
- Liquid alternative investment – Strategy offering hedge-fund-like exposures through liquid, publicly tradable vehicles
- Portfolio (finance) – Financial term for a collection of investments
  - Portfolio optimization – Process of selecting a portfolio
- Projects – Assignment planned to achieve a objective
- Real options valuation – Capital budgeting analysis term
- Return (finance) – Finance term; profit on an investment

== Funds ==
- Interest – Sum paid for the use of money
  - Interest rate – Percentage of a sum of money charged for its use
- Investment fund – Way of investing money alongside other investors
- Mutual fund – Professionally managed investment fund
- Stock fund – Investment fund for the asset of stocks

== Shares ==
- Common stock – Form of corporate equity ownership
  - Differential voting right shares – Shares with unequal voting rights
- Earnings per share – Value of earnings per outstanding share of common stock for a company
  - Earnings call – Meeting revealing a public company's finances
- Golden share – Special type of company share
- High-yield stock – Stock offering above-average dividend yield
- Issued shares – Shares of a corporation owned by shareholders
  - Equity issuance – Sale of new shares to raise capital
- Leading stock – Stock outperforming the broader market
- Monthly income preferred stock – Type of stock senior to common stock
- Non-voting stock – Stock that provides the shareholder very little or no vote on corporate matters
- Participating preferred stock – Preferred shares with extra profit participation
- Preferred stock – Type of stock senior to common stock
- Registered share – Share recorded in the owner's name
- Secondary shares – Existing shares sold by current holders
- Stock exchange – Organization that provides services for stock brokers and traders to trade securities

== Theory ==
- Fisher separation theorem – Firm"s investment decision is independent of its owners' consumption preferences
- Modigliani–Miller theorem – Economic theory about capital structure
- Theory of the firm – Theories relating to firms' roles in the economy
- The Theory of Investment Value – Basis for corporate valuation
- Agency theory – Conflict of interest when one person acts on another's behalf
  - Agency costs – Costs arising from conflicts of interest between principals and their agents
  - Contract theory – Economic analysis of contracts
- Capital structure – Mix of funds used to start and sustain a business
  - Corporate finance § Capitalization structure
  - Capital structure substitution theory – Theory proposing that managers adjust capital structure to maximize earnings per share
  - Pecking order theory – Theory that firms prefer internal funds, then debt, and use equity last
  - Market timing hypothesis – Hypothesis that firms adjust financing decisions to exploit favourable market conditions
  - Trade-off theory of capital structure – Financial concept
  - Merton model – Model that values credit risk using option-based default mechanics
  - Tax shield – Reduction in taxable income achieved through allowable deductible expenses
- Dividend policy – Policies in finance
  - Corporate finance § Dividend policy
  - Walter model – Policies in finance
  - Gordon model – Valuation model that prices a stock by discounting expected future dividends
  - Lintner model – American economist (1916–1983)
  - Residuals theory – Policies in finance
  - Signaling hypothesis – Policies in finance
  - Clientele effect – Investor shifts caused by policy changes that attract different investor groups
  - Dividend puzzle – Why firms pay dividends despite theories predicting investor indifference
  - Treasury stock § Buying back shares
  - Dividend tax – Tax levied on stock earnings
- Capital budgeting – How an organization allocates its cash and resources
  - Corporate finance § Investment and project valuation
  - Clean surplus accounting – Valuing firms by changes in book value excluding shareholder transactions
  - Residual income valuation – Equity valuation method based on the present value of future residual income
  - Economic value added – Value of a firm's profit after deduction of capital costs
  - Market value added – Measure comparing a firm's market value with the capital invested in it
  - T-model – Connects fundamentals with investment return
  - Adjusted present value – Valuation separating financing effects
  - Uncertainty
    - Penalized present value – Method of budgeting where an investment's value is penalized according to its risk
    - Expected commercial value – Prospect-weighted valuation method for assessing uncertain project outcomes
    - Risk-adjusted net present value – Valuation in finance
    - Contingent claim valuation – Derivative whose payoff depends on an underlying asset or uncertain future event
    - Real options – Capital budgeting analysis term
    - Monte Carlo methods – Probabilistic measurement methods
- Risk management
  - Corporate finance § Financial risk management
  - Financial risk management § Corporate finance
  - Hedging irrelevance proposition – Protecting economic value by managing risk exposure
  - Risk modeling – Modelling financial risks
  - Risk-adjusted return on capital – Profitability measurement framework

== Related lists ==
- Index of accounting articles
- Index of economics articles
- Index of international trade articles
- Outline of actuarial science
- Outline of business
- Outline of civil law (common law)
- Outline of organizational theory

== See also ==
- Financial statements – Formal record of financial activities
- Initial public offering – Type of securities offering in which a private company goes public
- Investment strategy – Rules to develop an investment portfolio
- Leprechaun economics – Term used to describe a distortion of Ireland's GDP by Apple Inc restructuring
