= Dividend policy =

Policies in finance

Dividend policy, in financial management and corporate finance, is concerned with the policies regarding dividends; more specifically paying a cash dividend in the present, as opposed to, presumably, paying an increased dividend at a later stage. Practical and theoretical considerations will inform this thinking.

== Management considerations ==
In setting dividend policy, management must pay regard to various practical considerations, often independent of the theory, outlined below. In general, whether to issue dividends, and what amount, is determined mainly on the basis of the company's unappropriated profit (excess cash) and influenced by the company's long-term earning power: when cash surplus exists and is not needed by the firm, then management is expected to pay out some or all of those surplus earnings in the form of cash dividends or to repurchase the company's stock through a share buyback program. At the same time, although the decisioning must weigh the best use of those resources for the firm - i.e. investment needs and future prospects - it must also take into account shareholders' preferences, and the relationship with capital markets more broadly.

As regards the firm: If there are no NPV positive opportunities, i.e. projects where returns exceed the hurdle rate, and excess cash surplus is not needed, then management should return some or all of the excess cash to shareholders as dividends. However, potentially limiting any distribution, the firm's overall finances, liquidity, and legal / debt covenants in place will also be of relevance. Management may also wish to avoid "unsettling" the capital markets by changing policy abruptly; see below re signaling.

As regards shareholders: As a general rule, shareholders of "growth companies" would prefer managers to retain earnings so as to fund future growth internally (or have a share buyback program) whereas shareholders of value or secondary stocks would prefer the management to distribute surplus earnings in the form of cash dividends. Re the former, for example, the thinking is dividend payments, and share price, will be higher in the future, (more than) offsetting the retainment of current earnings. See Clientele effect.

Regarding both: Management must choose the form of the dividend distribution, generally as cash dividends or via a share buyback. Various factors may be taken into consideration: where shareholders must pay tax on dividends, firms may elect to retain earnings or to perform a stock buyback, in both cases increasing the value of shares outstanding. Alternatively, some companies will pay "dividends" from stock rather than in cash; see Corporate action.

== Relevance of dividend policy ==
There are several schools of thought on dividends, in particular their impact on firm value. A key consideration will be whether there are any tax disadvantages associated with dividends: i.e. dividends attract a higher tax rate as compared, e.g., to capital gains; see dividend tax and Retained earnings § Tax implications. Here, per the Modigliani–Miller theorem, as below: if there are no such disadvantages - and companies can raise equity finance cheaply, i.e. can issue stock at low cost - then dividend policy is value neutral; if dividends suffer a tax disadvantage, then increasing dividends should reduce firm value. Regardless, but particularly in the second (more realistic) case, other considerations apply; see Corporate finance § Dividend theory.

=== Modigliani-Miller theorem ===
The Modigliani–Miller theorem states that dividend policy does not influence the value of the firm. The theory, more generally, is framed in the context of capital structure, and states that — in the absence of taxes, bankruptcy costs, agency costs, and asymmetric information, and in an efficient market — the enterprise value of a firm is unaffected by how that firm is financed: i.e. its value is unaffected by whether the firm is funded by retained earnings, or whether it raises capital by issuing shares or by selling debt.

The dividend decision, relating to both equity financing and retained earnings, is, in turn, value neutral. Here, shareholders are indifferent as to how the firm divides its profits between new investments and dividends. The logic, essentially, is that capital used in paying out dividends will be replaced by new capital raised through issuing shares. The latter will increase the number of shares, diluting earnings, and hence lead to a decline in share price. Thus any increase in firm value because of the dividend payment (e.g. per the Gordon model, as below, where value is a function of dividend) will be offset by the decrease in value due to raising new capital.

=== Gordon model ===
In contrast to the above, under the dividend discount model, and particularly the “Growth model” of Myron J. Gordon, the value of the firm (or at least its equity) is explicitly a function of dividends paid. Here investors are seen to prefer a “bird in the hand”: i.e. dividends are certain as compared to income from future capital gains. The resultant valuation formula thus returns value as the present value of “all” future dividends:

$$P = \frac{D_1}{r-g}$$

where: $P$ is the current stock price; $g$ is the constant growth rate in perpetuity expected for the dividends; $r$ is the constant cost of equity capital (k_{e}) for that company; $D_1$ is the value of dividends at the end of the first period, which may be substituted with earnings multiplied by a retention ratio.

This formula, essentially, applies a perpetuity formula to the current dividend, set to grow at a sustainable rate. Strictly, it is then to be applied only to “mature “companies. Further, an implication as regards policy, is that (per the formula) dividends are paid only where investors’ required return - i.e. cost of equity, k_{e} - is greater than the company’s sustainable growth rate. Conversely while the company is enjoying growth in excess of other comparable firms (and k_{e}) then it should not pay dividends, instead, funding its capital requirement with retained profits.

=== Lintner's model ===
John Lintner provides an explicit formula for determining dividend policy; it is particularly relevant to a publicly traded company. A key model-assumption is that management will consider two factors in determining the dividend amount, with both indicating higher dividends correspondingly. The first is the net present value of future earnings; the second is the sustainability of these earnings. At the same time, any policy must recognize that investors will prefer to receive their dividend with (some) certainty, and thus, if possible, management will maintain a constant rate of dividend (even if the results in a particular period are not up to the mark). The theory followed the observation that companies often set their long-run dividends-to-earnings target as a function of expected NPV positive "projects" (see capital budgeting).

Expressed as a model, two parameters are considered: the target payout ratio and the rate at which current dividends adjust to that target:

$$\begin{align}
D_{t} &= D_{t-1}+\rho\cdot  \left ( D_{t}^{*}-D_{t-1} \right ) \\
&= D_{t-1}+\rho\cdot  \left ( \tau \cdot E_{t}-D_{t-1} \right ) \\
&= \rho\cdot \tau \cdot E_{t}+(1-\rho)\cdot D_{t-1} \\
&= \rho\cdot D_{t}^{*}+(1-\rho)\cdot D_{t-1}
\end{align}$$

where:

- $D_{t}$ is the dividend per share at time $t$
- $D_{t-1}$ is the dividend per share at time $(t-1)$, i.e. last year's dividend per share
- $\rho$ is the adjustment rate or the partial adjustment coefficient, with $0 \leq \rho \leq 1$
- $D_{t}^{*}$ is the target dividend per share at time $t$, with $D_{t}^{*} = \tau \cdot E_{t}$
- $\tau$ is the target payout ratio on earnings per share (or on free-cash-flow per share), with $0 \leq \tau \leq 1$
- $E_{t}$ is the earnings per share (or free cash flow per share) at time $t$

When applying this model to U.S. stocks, Lintner found $\rho \simeq 30%$ and $\tau \simeq 50%$.

The above implies some symmetry. However, in reality, the progression of dividends is asymmetric: increases in dividend are usually small and frequent, while decreases (including cutting the dividend altogether) are large and infrequent.

=== Capital structure substitution theory and dividends ===
The capital structure substitution theory (CSS) describes the relationship between earnings, stock price and capital structure of public companies. The theory is based on the hypothesis that management "manipulates" capital structure such that earnings per share (EPS) are maximized. As a corollary, the CSS theory is seen to provide management with (some) guidance on dividend policy - more directly in fact than other approaches, such as the Walter model and the Gordon model. In fact, CSS reverses the traditional order of cause and effect by implying that company valuation ratios drive dividend policy, and not vice versa.

The theory provides an explanation as to why some companies pay dividends and others do not: When redistributing cash to shareholders, management can typically choose between dividends and share repurchases. In most cases dividends are taxed higher than capital gains, and thus investors - and management - would typically be expected to select a share repurchase. However, for some companies share repurchases lead to a reduction in EPS, and it in those cases the company would select to pay dividends. From the CSS theory, then, it can be derived that debt-free companies should prefer repurchases whereas companies with a debt-equity ratio larger than

$$\frac{D}{E_{\text{q}}}>\frac{1-T_{\text{C}}}{1-T_{\text{D}}}-1$$

should prefer dividends as a means to distribute cash to shareholders, where

- D is the company's total long-term debt
- $E_{\text{q}}$ is the company's total equity
- $T_{\text{C}}$ is the tax rate on capital gains
- $T_{\text{D}}$ is the tax rate on dividends

Companies may then "target" a dynamic Debt-to-equity ratio.

The CSS theory does not have 'invisible' or 'hidden' parameters such as the equity risk premium, the discount rate, the expected growth rate or expected inflation. As a consequence the theory can be tested in an unambiguous way. Low-valued, high-leverage companies with limited investment opportunities and a high profitability, use dividends as the preferred means to distribute cash to shareholders, as is documented by empirical research.

=== Dividend signaling hypothesis ===
The dividend signaling hypothesis posits that a company's announcement of an increase in dividend payouts constitutes an opportunity to signal to the market that the firm is "better off than the average". Increasing a company's dividend payout may then predict (or lead to) favorable performance of the company's stock in the future. (See also Earnings guidance.)

The theory is built on the assumption that, although in a perfect market there is no information asymmetry, in practice the firm's management will be better informed than the market in estimating the true value of the firm. (See Efficient-market hypothesis.) It has some support in game theory, constituting a form of "signaling game".

Note that the concept of dividend signaling has been contested. At the same time, however, the theory is still used by some investors, and is supported by empirical studies showing that a firm's share price may increase significantly upon announcement of dividend increases, despite the cost inherent in the dividend tax.

=== Walter's model ===
Walter's model holds that dividend policy is a function of the relationship between the company's return on investment and its cost of equity; a corollary is that the dividend decision will also affect the value of the company.

The underlying argument is that capital retained will be invested by the firm in its profitable opportunities, whereas dividends paid to shareholders are invested elsewhere. Here, the firm's achievable rate of return, r, is proxied by its return on equity; while its shareholders' required rate of return is proxied by the firm's cost of equity, or k_{e}. Thus, if r < k_{e} then the firm should distribute the profits in the form of dividends; however, if r > k_{e} then the firm should invest these retained earnings. The value of the company, then, may be seen as the present value of the return on investments made from retained earnings, and a theoretical value is expressed as:

$P={D + r((E-D)/k_e) \over {k_e}} \,$

where

- P = Market price of the share
- D = Dividend per share
- r = Rate of return on the firm's investments
- k_{e} = Cost of equity
- E = Earnings per share

The model assumes, at least implicitly, that retained earnings are the only source of financing, and that k_{e} and r are constant; given these assumptions, the approach is subject to some criticism.

=== Residuals theory of dividends ===
Under a Residual Dividend policy, dividends are paid out from "spare cash" or excess earnings; this is to be contrasted with a "smoothed" payout policy. A firm applying a residual dividend policy will evaluate its available investment opportunities to determine required capital expenditure, and in parallel, the amount of equity finance that would be needed for these investments; it will also confirm that the cost of retained earnings is less than the cost of equity capital. If appropriate, it will then use its retained profits to finance capital investments. Finally, if there is any surplus after this financing, then the firm will distribute these residual funds as dividends.

Although absent of any explicit link to value, such an approach may, in fact, impact share price: This policy will attract investors who appreciate that the firm is trying to employ its capital optimally (and will require fewer new stock issues with correspondingly lower flotation costs); it also delays (or removes) the payment of the secondary tax on dividends; see Retained earnings § Tax implications. At the same time, however, such a policy may result in conflicting signals (see above) being sent to investors. It also represents an increased level of risk for investors, as dividend income remains uncertain, and the share price may respond correspondingly; see Residual income valuation.

== See also ==
- Clientele effect
- Dividend puzzle
- Look-through earnings
- Dividend payout ratio
- Dividend yield
- Dividend cover
- Dividend future
- Ex dividend
