= Dividend puzzle =

Why firms pay dividends despite theories predicting investor indifference

The dividend puzzle, as originally framed by Fischer Black, relates to two interrelated questions in corporate finance and financial economics: why do corporations pay dividends; and why do investors "pay attention" to dividends?

A key observation here, is that companies that pay dividends are rewarded by investors with higher valuations (in fact, there are several dividend valuation models; see The Theory of Investment Value). What is puzzling, however, is that it should not matter to investors whether a firm pays dividends or not: as an owner of the firm, the investor should be indifferent as to receiving dividends or having these re-invested in the business; see Modigliani–Miller theorem. A further and related observation is that these dividends attract a higher tax rate as compared, e.g., to capital gains from the firm repurchasing shares as an alternative payout policy. For other considerations, see dividend policy and Pecking order theory.

A range of explanations is provided.

- The long-term holders of these stocks are typically institutional investors. These (often) have a need for the liquidity provided by dividends; further, many, such as pension funds, are tax-exempt. (See Clientele effect.)
- From the signalling perspective, cash dividends are "a useful device" to convey insider information about corporate performance to outsiders, and thereby reduce information asymmetry; see Dividend signaling hypothesis.
- Behavioral economics posits that for investors, outcomes received with certainty are overweighed relative to uncertain outcomes; see Prospect theory. Thus here, respectively, investors will prefer (and pay for) certain cash dividends, as opposed to reinvestment in the firm with possible consequent price appreciation.
- Under Agency theory, dividend policy is seen as a way to mitigate the principal–agent problem: by paying out a portion of free cash flow as dividends, shareholders (principals) can limit the actions available to managers (agents, who might otherwise engage, e.g., in "empire building").
