= Sum of perpetuities method =

The sum of perpetuities method (SPM) is a way of valuing a business assuming that investors discount the future earnings of a firm regardless of whether earnings are paid as dividends or retained. SPM is an alternative to the Gordon growth model (GGM) and can be applied to business or stock valuation if the business is assumed to have constant earnings and/or dividend growth. The variables are:

- $P$ is the value of the stock or business
- $E$ is a company's earnings
- $G$ is the company's constant growth rate
- $K$ is the company's risk adjusted discount rate
- $D$ is the company's dividend payment

$$P = (\frac{E*G}{K^2}) + (\frac{D}{K})$$

== Comparison with other models ==
=== SPM and the Walter model ===
SPM is a generalized version of the Walter model. The primary difference between SPM and the Walter model is the substitution of earnings and growth in the equation. Consequently, any variable which may influence a company's constant growth rate such as inflation, external financing, and changing industry dynamics can be considered using SPM in addition to growth caused by the reinvestment of retained earnings internally. Because $G$ is substituted in the equation, SPM is also directly comparable to other constant growth models.

=== SPM and the Gordon growth model ===
In a special case when a company's return on equity is equal to its risk adjusted discount rate, SPM is equivalent to the Gordon growth model (GGM). However, because GGM only considers the present value of dividend payments, GGM cannot be used to value a business which does not pay dividends. Also, when a firm's return on equity is not equal to the discount rate, GGM becomes highly sensitive to input value changes. Alternatively, SPM values dividends and retained earnings separately, taking into consideration the present value of the future income generated by retained earnings, and then summing this result with the present value of expected dividends held constant in perpetuity. Consequently, SPM can be used to value a growing company regardless of dividend policy. SPM is also much less sensitive to input value changes when a company's return on equity is different from the discount rate. An empirical test shows that SPM is substantially more accurate in estimating observed stock market prices than the Gordon Growth Model.

=== SPM and the PEG ratio ===
The PEG ratio is a special case in the SPM equation. If a company does not pay dividends, and its risk adjusted discount rate is equal to 10%, SPM reduces to the PEG ratio:

$$P = (\frac{E*G}{K^2}) + (\frac{D}{K})$$
$$P = (\frac{E*G}{0.10^2}) + 0$$
$$P = E*G*100$$

SPM can be used to help explain the PEG ratio as it provides a derivation and theoretical framework for the PEG.

== Derivation of SPM ==
SPM is derived from the compound interest formula via the present value of a perpetuity equation. The derivation requires the additional variables $X$ and $R$, where $X$ is a company's retained earnings, and $R$ is a company's rate of return on equity. The following relationships are used in the derivation:

I: $E = X + D$
II: $G = (\frac{X}{E})*R$

=== Derivation ===
Given by relationship II, a company with perpetual life which pays all of its earnings out as dividends has a growth rate of zero. It can therefore be valued using the present value of a perpetuity equation:

$$P = \frac{E}{K} = \frac{D}{K}$$

However a company may elect to retain a portion of its earnings to produce incremental earnings and/or dividend growth. If the value of both dividends and retained earnings are considered, and the return on equity is equal to the firm's discount rate, the company could be valued by the same function (refer to relationship I):

$P = \frac{E}{K} = \frac{(X+D)}{K} = \frac{X}{K}+\frac{D}{K}$

Yet retained earnings are different from dividends paid, because dividend payments represent a cash inflow to a company's owners (shareholders) while retained earnings which are reinvested to produce growth are effectively an invested cash outflow. Therefore, when the rate of return on equity is not equal to the discount rate, the present value of the future income generated by the retained earnings $PVx$ must be considered rather than the amount of earnings retained today.

$P = \frac{PVx}{K} + \frac{D}{K}$

Where $PVx$ is the present value of the future income generated by the assets purchased using $X$. The income generated by $X$ depends on the firm's rate of return on equity and therefore $PVx$ is a function of $R$ where $X*R$, is equal to the income produced by the assets purchased using $X$. Assuming perpetual life and a constant rate of return on equity, $PVx$ can also be determined using the present value of a perpetuity equation:

$$PVx = \frac{X*R}{K}$$

Substituting $\frac{X*R}{K}$ for $PVx$ in the equation above produces the Walter model:

$$P = \frac{\frac{X*R}{K}}{K} + \frac{D}{K}$$

And given by relationship II, $X*R$ is equal to $E*G$. Substituting the term, $E*G$ into the above equation produces the SPM constant growth valuation model:

$$P = \frac{E*G}{K^2} + \frac{D}{K}$$

== Limitations of SPM ==
The SPM equation requires that all variables be held constant over time which may be unreasonable in many cases. These include the assumption of constant earnings and/or dividend growth, an unchanging dividend policy, and a constant risk profile for the firm. Outside financing may not be considered unless the financing is perpetually recurring as capital structure must also be held constant.
