= Morningstar Rating for Stocks =

The Morningstar Rating for Stocks debuted in 2001 and was initially applied to 500 stocks. The stock-rating system compares a stock's current market price with Morningstar's estimate of the stock's fair value. Like the Morningstar Rating for Funds, the rating is applied in the form of stars. According to Newsday, "A five-star rating is given to a stock if fair value is 30 percent or more above current market price, four stars if it is 10 percent to 30 percent above, and three stars for fair value 10 percent either side of price. A two-stars rating goes to issues with fair value 10 percent to 30 percent below price, while one star reflects value that is 30 percent or more below price."

Five-star stocks should offer an investor a return that is higher than the company's cost of equity. Low-rated stocks have significantly lower expected returns. Three-star stocks are those that should offer a "fair return", one that adequately compensates for the riskiness of the stock. They should also offer investors a return that is roughly comparable to the stock's cost of equity.
