= Free cash flow to equity =

Accounting metric

In corporate finance, free cash flow to equity (FCFE) is a metric of how much cash can be distributed to the equity shareholders of the company as dividends or stock buybacks—after all expenses, reinvestments, and debt repayments are taken care of. It is also referred to as the levered free cash flow or the flow to equity (FTE). Whereas dividends are the cash flows actually paid to shareholders, the FCFE is the cash flow simply available to shareholders. The FCFE is usually calculated as a part of DCF or LBO modelling and valuation.

== Basic formulae ==
Assuming there is no preferred stock outstanding:

$$FCFE = FCFF + Net\ Borrowing - Interest*(1-t)$$

where:

- FCFF is the free cash flow to firm;
- Net Borrowing is the difference between debt principals paid and raised;
- Interest*(1–t) is the firm's after-tax interest expense.

or

$$FCFE = NI + D\& A - Capex - \Delta WC + Net\ Borrowing$$

or

$$FCFE = NI - [(1-b) (Capex-D\& A) + (1-b) (\Delta WC)]$$

where:

- NI is the firm's net income;
- D&A is the depreciation and amortisation;
- b is the debt ratio;
- Capex is the capital expenditure;
- ΔWC is the change in working capital;
- Net Borrowing is the difference between debt principals paid and raised;
- In this case, it is important not to include interest expense, as this is already figured into net income.

== Vs. FCFF ==
- Free cash flow to firm (FCFF) is the cash flow available to all the firm's providers of capital once the firm pays all operating expenses (including taxes) and expenditures needed to support the firm's productive capacity. The providers of capital include common stockholders, bondholders, preferred stockholders, and other claimholders.
- Free cash flow to equity (FCFE) is the cash flow available to the firm's common stockholders only.
- If the firm is all-equity financed, its FCFF is equal to FCFE.
  - FCFF is the cash flow available to the suppliers of capital after all operating expenses (including taxes) are paid and working and fixed capital investments are made.
  - It is calculated by making the following adjustments to EBIT.

== Negative FCFE ==
Like FCFF, the free cash flow to equity can be negative. If FCFE is negative, it is a sign that the firm will need to raise or earn new equity, not necessarily immediately. Some examples include:

- Large negative net income may result in the negative FCFE;
- Reinvestment needs, such as large capex, may overwhelm net income, which is often the case for growth companies, especially early in the life cycle.
- Large debt repayments coming due that have to be funded with equity cash flows can cause negative FCFE; highly levered firms that are trying to bring their debt ratios down can go through years of negative FCFE.
- The waves of the reinvestment process, when firms invest large amounts of cash in some years and nothing in others, can cause the FCFE to be negative in the big reinvestment years and positive in others;
- FCFF is a preferred metric for valuation when FCFE is negative or when the firm's capital structure is unstable.

== Uses ==
There are two ways to estimate the equity value using free cash flows:

- Discounting free cash flows to firm (FCFF) at the weighted average cost of capital (WACC) yields the enterprise value. The firm's net debt and the value of other claims are then subtracted from EV to calculate the equity value.
- If only the free cash flows to equity (FCFE) are discounted, then the relevant discount rate should be the required return on equity. This provides a more direct way of estimating equity value.
- In theory, both approaches should yield the same equity value if the inputs are consistent.
