= Intermediated research =

In finance, intermediated research is a type of fundamental analysis or investment analysis of a business to establish its value for investors that attempts to avoid commercial pressure or influence.

Many banks and brokers provide research to the investment community, however this form of research suffers from a real or perceived lack of objectivity. For example, this research may be subject to influence from within a bank from, say, investment bankers keen to win company’s IPO mandate.

An alternative form is known as independent research or alternative research, this is research that is not provided by a bank or broker. However, someone has to fund the costs of conducting the research, and when the funder is the company being researched, this form of independent research is termed “sponsored” or “company-paid” research. Unfortunately, with the subject company paying directly for these services, this form of research suffers from a real or perceived lack of objectivity, which reduces its value to investors and hence to the companies themselves.

Intermediated research improves significantly upon the sponsored research model, by introducing important safeguards into the commercial and research process framework. The key structure is that the company has no choice in its allocation to a research provider; once matched with the research provider, the company is under a long-term contract in order to minimize commercial pressure or influence; and the fees paid to the research provider are not sufficiently material for the company to be able to exert any influence over the content or conclusions of the research report. Collectively, these measures enhance the value of the report to investors and consequently, to the company itself.

The intermediated research framework includes the further protections; ensuring that the independent research firms involved have no investment banking or brokerage operations in their business models; conduct no traditional company-paid research; deliver a standard template for analysis of every company so that all standard topics are covered; and avoiding ratings and target prices in the reports, since these can risk becoming a focus of pressure exerted on the research provider by the subject company.
