= Equity value =

Value of company available to shareholders

Equity value is the value of a company available to owners or shareholders. It is the enterprise value plus all cash and cash equivalents, short and long-term investments, and less all short-term debt, long-term debt and minority interests.

Equity value accounts for all the ownership interest in a firm including the value of unexercised stock options and securities convertible to equity.

From a mergers and acquisitions to an academic perspective, equity value differs from market capitalization or market value in that it incorporates all equity interests in a firm whereas market capitalization or market value only reflects those common shares currently outstanding.

== Calculating equity value ==
Equity value can be calculated in two ways, either the intrinsic value method, or the fair market value method. The intrinsic value method is calculated as follows:

Equity Value = 
Market capitalization 
+ Amount that in-the-money stock options are in the money
+ Value of equity issued from in-the-money convertible securities 
- Proceeds from the conversion of convertible securities

The fair market value method is as follows:

Equity Value = 
Market capitalization 
+ fair value of all stock options (in the money and out of the money), calculated using the Black–Scholes formula or a similar method
+ Value of convertible securities in excess of what the same securities would be valued without the conversion attribute

The fair market value method more accurately captures the value of out of the money securities.
