= Myron J. Gordon =

American economist (1920–2010)

- Born: October 15, 1920
- Died: July 5, 2010 (aged 89); Summit, New Jersey

Academic background
- Education: Wisconsin-Madison (B.A. 1941); Harvard (Ph.D. 1947)
- Influences: John Maynard Keynes

Academic work
- Discipline: Financial economics
- School or tradition: Post-Keynesian economics
- Institutions: University of Toronto
- Notable ideas: Gordon model
- Awards: Ford Foundation Faculty Fellow (1963); Connaught Faculty Fellow (1982); President, American Finance Association (1975); Fellow, Royal Society of Canada (1993); Honorary Doctor of Laws, McMaster University (1993); Honorary Doctor of Laws, University of Toronto (2005)

Myron Jules Gordon, FRSC (October 15, 1920 – July 5, 2010) was an American economist. He was Professor Emeritus of Finance at the Rotman School of Management, University of Toronto. In 1956, Gordon along with Eli Shapiro, published a method for valuing company shares or business, now known as the Gordon growth model.

== Early life and education ==
Myron Jules Gordon was born on October 15, 1920, to Ukrainian-Jewish parents who had settled in New York. He was raised in Washington Heights and Brooklyn by his parents, Jack, a salesman, and Eva, a pianist. He graduated from the University of Wisconsin–Madison in 1941 with a degree in economics, after switching his major from journalism. He then served in the United States Army until 1946.

== Academic career ==
Gordon held a B.A. from the University of Wisconsin–Madison (1941), a M.A. from Harvard University (1947), and a Ph.D. from Harvard (1952). He was an assistant professor at Carnegie Mellon University (1947–1952), then an associate professor at the Massachusetts Institute of Technology (1952–1962) and a professor at the University of Rochester (1962–1970) prior to joining the University of Toronto in 1970. His contributions to the field of accounting (and the application of economics and mathematics to accounting) are especially significant and worthy to note. As a leading author of accounting textbooks, he helped educate generations of accounting, business, and management students.

Gordon served as president of the American Finance Association in 1975–1976. He was named a fellow of the Royal Society of Canada in 1993, and received an Honorary Doctor of Laws degree at McMaster University in 1993, and another at the University of Toronto in 2005.

== Personal life ==
During his time in the military, Gordon met and married his wife Helen Elizabeth Taylor, known as Betty. They had two sons, Joe and David. Though Gordon was of Ukrainian-Jewish descent and his wife was the daughter of Baptist missionaries, they became active members of the Unitarian Church.

Gordon died in 2010 at the age of 89, after multiple strokes and general ill health.
