= Cost of capital =

Cost of a company's funds

In economics and accounting, the cost of capital is the cost of a company's funds (both debt and equity), or from an investor's point of view is "the required rate of return on a portfolio company's existing securities". It is used to evaluate new projects of a company. It is the minimum return that investors expect for providing capital to the company, thus setting a benchmark that a new project has to meet.

== Basic concept ==
For an investment to be worthwhile, the expected return on capital has to be higher than the cost of capital. Given a number of competing investment opportunities, investors are expected to put their capital to work in order to maximize the return. In other words, the cost of capital is the rate of return that capital could be expected to earn in the best alternative investment of equivalent risk; this is the opportunity cost of capital. If a project is of similar risk to a company's average business activities it is reasonable to use the company's average cost of capital as a basis for the evaluation or cost of capital is a firm's cost of raising funds. However, for projects outside the core business of the company, the current cost of capital may not be the appropriate yardstick to use, as the risks of the businesses are not the same.

A company's securities typically include both debt and equity; one must therefore calculate both the cost of debt and the cost of equity to determine a company's cost of capital. Importantly, both cost of debt and equity must be forward looking, and reflect the expectations of risk and return in the future. This means, for instance, that the past cost of debt is not a good indicator of the actual forward looking cost of debt.

Once cost of debt and cost of equity have been determined, their blend, the weighted average cost of capital (WACC), can be calculated. This WACC can then be used as a discount rate for a project's projected free cash flows to the firm.

== Example ==
Suppose a company considers taking on a project or investment of some kind, for example installing a new piece of machinery in one of their factories. Installing this new machinery will cost money; paying the technicians to install the machinery, transporting the machinery, buying the parts and so on. This new machinery is also expected to generate new profit (otherwise, assuming the company is interested in profit, the company would not consider the project in the first place). So the company will finance the project with two broad categories of finance: issuing debt, by taking out a loan or other debt instrument such as a bond; and issuing equity, usually by issuing new shares.

The new debt-holders and shareholders who have decided to invest in the company to fund this new machinery will expect a return on their investment: debt-holders require interest payments and shareholders require dividends (or capital gain from selling the shares after their value increases). The idea is that some of the profit generated by this new project will be used to repay the debt and satisfy the new shareholders.

Suppose that one of the sources of finance for this new project was a bond (issued at par value) of $200,000 with an interest rate of 5%. This means that the company would issue the bond to some willing investor, who would give the $200,000 to the company which it could then use, for a specified period of time (the term of the bond) to finance its project. The company would also make regular payments to the investor of 5% of the original amount they invested ($10,000), at a yearly or monthly rate depending on the specifics of the bond (these are called coupon payments). At the end of the lifetime of the bond (when the bond matures), the company would return the $200,000 they borrowed.

Suppose the bond had a lifetime of ten years and coupon payments were made yearly. This means that the investor would receive $10,000 every year for ten years, and then finally their $200,000 back at the end of the ten years. From the investor's point of view, their investment of $200,000 would be regained at the end of the ten years (entailing zero gain or loss), but they would have also gained from the coupon payments; the $10,000 per year for ten years would amount to a net gain of $100,000 to the investor. This is the amount that compensates the investor for taking the risk of investing in the company (since, if it happens that the project fails completely and the company goes bankrupt, there is a chance that the investor does not get their money back).

This net gain of $100,000 was paid by the company to the investor as a reward for investing their money in the company. In essence, this is how much the company paid to borrow $200,000. It was the cost of raising $200,000 of new capital. So to raise $200,000 the company had to pay $100,000 out of their profits; thus we say that the cost of debt in this case was 50%.

Theoretically, if the company were to raise further capital by issuing more of the same bonds, the new investors would also expect a 50% return on their investment (although in practice the required return varies depending on the size of the investment, the lifetime of the loan, the risk of the project and so on).

The cost of equity follows the same principle: the investors expect a certain return from their investment, and the company must pay this amount in order for the investors to be willing to invest in the company. (Although the cost of equity is calculated differently since dividends, unlike interest payments, are not necessarily a fixed payment or a legal requirement.)

== Cost of debt ==
When companies borrow funds from outside lenders, the interest paid on these funds is called the cost of debt. The cost of debt is computed by taking the rate on a risk-free bond whose duration matches the term structure of the corporate debt, then adding a default premium. This default premium will rise as the amount of debt increases (since, all other things being equal, the risk rises as the cost of debt rises). Since in most cases debt expense is a deductible expense, the cost of debt is computed on an after-tax basis to make it comparable with the cost of equity (earnings are taxed as well). Thus, for profitable firms, debt is discounted by the tax rate. The formula can be written as

$$K_D = (R_f + \text{credit risk rate})(1-T)$$,

where $T$ is the corporate tax rate and $R_f$ is the risk free rate.

== Cost of equity ==
The cost of equity is inferred by comparing the investment to other investments (comparable) with similar risk profiles. It is commonly computed using the capital asset pricing model formula:

Cost of equity = Risk free rate of return + Premium expected for risk
Cost of equity = Risk free rate of return + Beta × (market rate of return – risk free rate of return)

where Beta = sensitivity to movements in the relevant market. Thus in symbols we have

$$E_s = R_f + \beta_s(R_m - R_f)$$

where:

E_{s} is the expected return for a security;
R_{f} is the expected risk-free return in that market (government bond yield);
β_{s} is the sensitivity to market risk for the security;
R_{m} is the historical return of the stock market; and
(R_{m} – R_{f}) is the risk premium of market assets over risk free assets.

The risk free rate is the yield on long term bonds in the particular market, such as government bonds.

An alternative to the estimation of the required return by the capital asset pricing model as above, is the use of the Fama–French three-factor model.

=== Expected return ===
The expected return (or required rate of return for investors) can be calculated with the "dividend capitalization model", which is

$$K_{cs} = \frac{\text{Dividend}_{\text{Payment/Share}}(1+\text{Growth})} {\text{Price}_\text{Market}} + \text{Growth}_\text{rate}$$.

=== Comments ===
The models state that investors will expect a return that is the risk-free return plus the security's sensitivity to market risk (β) times the market risk premium.

The risk premium varies over time and place, but in some developed countries during the twentieth century it has averaged around 5% whereas in the emerging markets, it can be as high as 7%. The equity market real capital gain return has been about the same as annual real GDP growth. The capital gains on the Dow Jones Industrial Average have been 1.6% per year over the period 1910–2005. The dividends have increased the total "real" return on average equity to the double, about 3.2%.

The sensitivity to market risk (β) is unique for each firm and depends on everything from management to its business and capital structure. This value cannot be known "ex ante" (beforehand), but can be estimated from ex post (past) returns and past experience with similar firms.

==== Cost of retained earnings/cost of internal equity ====
Note that retained earnings are a component of equity, and, therefore, the cost of retained earnings (internal equity) is equal to the cost of equity as explained above. Dividends (earnings that are paid to investors and not retained) are a component of the return on capital to equity holders, and influence the cost of capital through that mechanism.

Cost of internal equity = [(next year's dividend per share/(current market price per share - flotation costs)] + growth rate of dividends)]

== Weighted average cost of capital ==
The weighted cost of capital (WACC) is used in finance to measure a firm's cost of capital. WACC is not dictated by management. Rather, it represents the minimum return that a company must earn on an existing asset base to satisfy its creditors, owners, and other providers of capital, or they will invest elsewhere.

The total capital for a firm is the value of its equity (for a firm without outstanding warrants and options, this is the same as the company's market capitalization) plus the cost of its debt (the cost of debt should be continually updated as the cost of debt changes as a result of interest rate changes). Notice that the "equity" in the debt to equity ratio is the market value of all equity, not the shareholders' equity on the balance sheet. To calculate the firm's weighted cost of capital, we must first calculate the costs of the individual financing sources: Cost of Debt, Cost of Preference Capital, and Cost of Equity Cap.

Calculation of WACC is an iterative procedure which requires estimation of the fair market value of equity capital if the company is not listed. The Adjusted Present Value method (APV) is much easier to use in this case as it separates the value of the project from the value of its financing program.

== Factors that can affect cost of capital ==
Below are a list of factors that might affect the cost of capital.

=== Capital structure ===
Because of tax advantages on debt issuance, it will be cheaper to issue debt rather than new equity (this is only true for profitable firms, tax breaks are available only to profitable firms). At some point, however, the cost of issuing new debt will be greater than the cost of issuing new equity. This is because adding debt increases the default risk – and thus the interest rate that the company must pay in order to borrow money. By utilizing too much debt in its capital structure, this increased default risk can also drive up the costs for other sources (such as retained earnings and preferred stock) as well. Management must identify the "optimal mix" of financing – the capital structure where the cost of capital is minimized so that the firm's value can be maximized.

The Thomson Financial league tables show that global debt issuance exceeds equity issuance with a 90 to 10 margin.

The structure of capital should be determined considering the weighted average cost of capital.

== Current dividend policy ==
=== Accounting information ===
Lambert, Leuz and Verrecchia (2007) have found that the quality of accounting information can affect a firm's cost of capital, both directly and indirectly.

== Modigliani–Miller theorem ==
If there were no tax advantages for issuing debt, and equity could be freely issued, Miller and Modigliani showed that, under certain assumptions (no tax, no possibility of bankruptcy), the value of a levered firm and the value of an unlevered firm should be the same.

== See also ==
- Ordinary share
- Preference share
