= Clientele effect =

Investor shifts caused by policy changes that attract different investor groups

The clientele effect is the idea that the set of investors attracted to a particular kind of security will affect the price of the security when policies or circumstances change. For instance, some investors want a company that doesn't pay dividends but instead invests that money in growing the business, whereas other investors prefer a stock that pays a high dividend, and still others want one that balances payout and reinvestment. If a company changes its dividend policy substantially, it is said to be subject to a clientele effect as some of its investors (its established clientele) decide to sell the security due to the change. Although commonly used in reference to dividend or coupon (interest) rates, it can also be used in the context of leverage (debt levels), changes in line of business, taxes, and other aspects of the company.

== Overview ==
The clientele effect refers to the idea that certain types of investors are attracted to particular types of securities or investment vehicles. For example, a company that issues a high-yield bond may attract a different type of investor than a company that issues a low-risk, low-yield bond.

For investors, it can be important to consider the types of securities that are likely to appeal to their desired clientele. For example, an investor who is looking for a stable, low-risk investment may be more likely to choose a bond issued by a stable, financially sound company, while an investor who is willing to take on more risk in exchange for the potential for higher returns may be more interested in a high-yield bond.

For companies, the clientele effect can be an important consideration when deciding on the types of securities to issue.
