= Flotation cost =

Cost incurred by a company in offering its securities to the public

Flotation cost is the total cost incurred by a company in offering its securities to the public. It arises from expenses such as underwriting fees, legal fees, and registration fees. Firms are well-advised to consider the magnitude of these fees, as they also impact how much capital they can raise from an initial public offering. The higher the flotation cost, the less viable the source.
