= Agency cost =

Costs arising from conflicts of interest between principals and their agents

An agency cost is an economic concept that refers to the costs associated with the relationship between a "principal" (an organization, person or group of persons), and an "agent". The agent is given powers to make decisions on behalf of the principal. However, the two parties may have different incentives and the agent generally has more information. The principal cannot directly ensure that its agent is always acting in its (the principal's) best interests. This potential divergence in interests is what gives rise to agency costs.

Common examples of this cost include:

- according to the Friedman doctrine, the cost borne by shareholders (the principals) when corporate management (the agent) buys other companies to expand its power, or spends money on vanity projects, instead of maximizing the value of the corporation;
- the cost borne by the voters of a politician's district (the principals) when the politician (the agent) passes legislation helpful to large contributors to their campaign rather than the voters.

Though effects of agency cost are present in any agency relationship, the term is most used in business contexts.

== Sources of the costs ==
Professor Michael Jensen and the late Professor William Meckling of the Simon School of Business, University of Rochester wrote an influential paper in 1976 titled "Theory of the Firm: Managerial Behavior, Agency Costs and Ownership Structure". Professor Jensen also wrote an important paper with Eugene Fama of University of Chicago titled "Agency Problems and Residual Claims". These works categories agency costs into three main sources:

1. Monitoring costs: Costs borne by the principal to mitigate the problems associated with using an agent. They may include gathering more information on what the agent is doing (e.g., the costs of producing financial statements or carrying out audits) or employing mechanisms to align the interests of the agent with those of the principal (e.g. compensating executives with equity payment such as stock options);
2. Bonding costs: Costs borne by the agent to build trust with their principal, such as costs associated with obtaining insurance, posting performance bonds, and other forms of financial assurance. Bonding costs may include contractually limiting the agent's decision making powers, or increasing the transparency of the agent's decision. In theory, agents will only take on bonding costs where the marginal benefit of these costs are equal to or greater than the marginal cost to the agent. Bonding costs may reduce the steps that a principal will need to take to monitor the agent. Therefore, the agent's acceptance of these costs may produce a higher utility outcome for both parties. In practice, bonding costs are nearly impossible to measure.
3. Residual loss: The costs that arise where the agent acts contrary to the best interests of the principal. It has been argued that the problem of residual loss is particularly acute in firms where ownership is separated from management, such as publicly traded corporations. In these firms, managers have control over the firm's resources but are not the ultimate owners, which can create a misalignment of incentives. One way to mitigate the problem of residual loss is through the use of performance-based compensation, which ties managerial compensation to the performance of the firm. This creates an incentive for managers to act in the best interests of the owners and to maximise the value of the firm's assets.

== In corporate governance ==
The relationship between a company's shareholder and the board of directors is generally considered to be a classic example of a principal–agent problem. The problem arises because there is a division between the ownership and control of the company, as a result of the residual loss. In such case, traditional mechanisms of corporate governance such as shareholder activism and proxy contests may be less effective due to the fragmented nature of ownership. The shareholders appoint the board to manage their asset but often lack the time, expertise or power to directly observe the actions of the board. In addition the shareholders may not be placed to understand of the repercussions of the board's decisions. As such, the board may be capable of acting in their own best interests without the oversight of the shareholders. As is noted by Adolf A. Berle, in his now famous work on company law, this issue is exacerbated in companies where each shareholders has only a small interest in the company. Such diversity in shareholder interests makes it unlikely that any one shareholder will exercise proper control over the board.

The classic case of corporate agency cost is the professional manager—specifically the CEO—with only a small stake in ownership, having interests differing from those of firm's owners.

Instead of making the company more efficient and profitable, the CEO may be tempted into:

- empire-building (i.e. increasing the size of the corporation, rather than the size of its profits, "which usually increases the executives' prestige, perks, compensation", etc., but at the expense of the efficiency and thus value of the firm);
- not firing subordinates whose mediocrity or even incompetence may be outweighed by their value as friends and colleagues;
- retaining large amounts of cash that, while wasteful, gives independence from capital markets;
- a maximum of compensation with a minimum of "strings"—in the form of pressure to perform—attached.
- management may even manipulate financial figures to optimize bonuses and stock-price-related options.

Information asymmetry contributes to moral hazard and adverse selection problems.

=== Mitigation of agency costs ===
Much of modern company law has evolved in order to limit the effects of agency costs. Company directors in common law jurisdictions owe fiduciary duties to their company. Notably these duties are not owed to the shareholders, but to the company. This is because the company is, in law, a legal person, separate from its shareholders. Breaches of duty by directors have the primary effect of causing losses to the company. The fiduciary duty requires the company director to act with due care and skill, in good faith, in the best interests of the company and without conflicts of interest. In some jurisdictions deliberate breaches of directors duties can result in civil or criminal penalties.

However, director's duties are difficult to enforce without the involvement of a liquidator. This is in part due to the asymmetry of information between the shareholders and the board (as noted above). In addition, as shareholders are not generally owed directors duties, they do not having standing to enforce them (but notably, some shareholders may have action in minority oppression). Similar issues arise with respect to obligations under a contract between the director and the company, given the operation of the privity doctrine. Instead, companies often opt for incentive schemes based on the performance of the company. These schemes provide bonuses to company directors when the company performs well. The director is therefore given an incentive to ensure the proper performance of the company, thereby aligning their interests with that of the shareholders. The costs of paying the bonus is still an agency cost, but the company will profit from paying this cost so long as the avoided residual cost (as defined above), is greater than the bonus.

Another key method by which agency costs are reduced is through legislative requirements that companies undertake audits of their financial statements. Publicly listed companies must also undertake disclosure to the market. These requirements seek to mitigate the information asymmetry between the board and the shareholders. The requirement to make disclosure reduces monitoring costs, and directors are less able to abuse their position when they will be required to disclose their shortcomings.

=== Concentrated shareholders ===
A concentrated shareholder structure can result in small groups that hold a significant proportion of the company’s shares. These shareholders can exercise significant control over the company as well as cause conflicts of interest between concentrated and other shareholders. For instance, concentrated shareholders may prioritise their profits and rights over those of other shareholders, thus increasing agency costs. For example, concentrated shareholders can make decisions that are more beneficial to themselves, such as higher dividend payouts or short-term, high-repayment business decisions. Such decisions may adversely affect the rights of other shareholders or the long-term survival of the company.

In jurisdictions outside the US and UK, a distinct form of agency costs arises from the existence of dominant shareholders within public corporations (Rojas, 2014).

In 2014, the study “Yesterday’s Heroes: Compensation and Creative Risk-Taking,” was published in the Journal of Finance. The authors explained how executive compensation could increase the rate of creative risk-taking, which can lead to better company performance but, at the same time, increase agency costs. The authors used data from the movie industry to illustrate that managers with past successes are more likely to take creative risks and try to bring higher profit returns with higher risks, such as investing in projects with a low probability of success, which can increase agency costs. The paper summarised that the executive compensation design should consider the potential of creative risk-taking and agency costs. Moreover, boards should carefully monitor the activities of managers to ensure that they are acting to achieve the best profit returns for shareholders.

The article “Large shareholders and corporate control” was published in the Journal of Political Economy in 1985. The paper provides a theoretical framework that illustrates the role of large shareholders in corporate governance and control. For instance, large shareholders can be crucial in solving agency problems between managers and other shareholders. In addition, they can monitor managers and intervene when necessary in order to protect their profits. Large shareholders can also play an essential role in corporate control. For example, large shareholders hold a significant stake in the company and can therefore influence critical decisions, such as the election of directors and the adoption of significant corporate policies. These decisions could increase the agency cost because large shareholders may decide to get maximum profit for themselves, which is not usually the best decision for the company's long-term survival.

=== Modern examples ===
Enron, a U.S. energy giant operated for decades trading large and highly demanded commodities. However, 2001 saw the fall of the giant as a result of poor management, and a deeply rooted principal-agent problem.

Typically speaking, chiefs and management are paid large salaries in the hope that these salaries deter from participation in high risk business. Yet Enron's board of directors decided to pay its managers in the form of stocks and options. In a very simplistic sense, this meant that managements compensation was pegged to stock performance and would mean any decision they made would be to the benefit of themselves (agents) and principals (shareholders).

Whilst in theory the concept was sound, it meant that Enron's management could now deceive the markets for their own monetary gain, and they did just that. Higher management decided to take on high debt and risky activities, leaving these transactions 'off the books' and essentially meaning Enron was falsifying information. Enron had reached the point where it was overstating profits by $1.2 billion and eventually lead to its collapse.

In Enron's collapse it also took down its accounting counterpart firm, Arthur Andersen, who were certifying Enron's books to be clean, when they very obviously weren't. In the case of Arthur Andersen again reiterating the power of the principal-agent problem, where the accounting firm (principal) trusts and follows orders from the chiefs (agents), who benefit greatly from the business of a large company like Enron.

The collapse of the two giants shook Wall street, and finance around the globe, leading to Enron's CEO Jeffrey Skilling being sentenced to serve 24 years in prison, as a result of various counts of conspiracy, fraud and insider trading. To this day, the Enron Scandal still remains as one of the key studies of the principal-agent problem.

Another potential example of the agency-cost problem (which also gives rise to questions of corporate social responsibility) arose with respect to the James Hardie Scandal, where James Hardie Industries sought to avoid payment of settlements to those former employees suffering from by asbestos related illnesses. Ultimately, the shareholders were almost unanimous in voting in favor of a compensation scheme for the victims. The interests of the shareholders may have favored funding the compensation scheme earlier than the directors were willing to. This divergence in interest, even where it address an issue of corporate social responsibility rather than strictly monetary concerns, could be considered an example of agency cost.

Further difficulties may arise where the interests of one shareholder conflicts with that of another. In the legal dispute Dodge v Ford Motor Co, Henry Ford sought to take Ford Motors in a direction that was disagreeable to one of the minority shareholders, Mr Dodge. Mr Ford's aggressive expansion policies (including his goals of reducing prices and increasing employee wages) were perceived by Mr Ford to be for the long-term benefit of the company, but they prevented dividends being paid in the short term. This was beneficial to long-term shareholders, such as Mr Ford, but Mr Dodge may not have held his shares for long enough to reap the benefit. As such, he brought a successful action in minority oppression in order to force the payment of dividends by the Ford Motor Co. Mr Dodge's inability to receive a dividend without litigation is another example of agency cost.

=== Bondholders ===
Bondholders typically value a risk-averse strategy since they do not benefit from higher profits. Stockholders on the other hand have an interest in taking on more risk. If a risky project succeeds shareholders will get all of the profits themselves, whereas if the projects fail the risk may be shared with the bondholder (although the bondholder has a higher priority for repayment in case of issuer bankruptcy than a shareholder).

Because bondholders know this, they often have costly and large ex-ante contracts in place prohibiting the management from taking on very risky projects that might arise, or they will simply raise the interest rate demanded, increasing the cost of capital for the company.

=== Labour ===
Labour agency costs refer to the costs arising when there is a conflict of interest between employers and employees. These conflicts can be caused by employees who may act to maximise their own interests rather than those of their employers, thus causing a loss of value for the employer. The agency cost could increase if the employees' abilities do not match their job requirements, which reduces productivity and increases costs for their employers. As a result, many employers are implementing various human resource management strategies to reduce these agency costs. For example, they design fair and transparent compensation and incentive schemes, provide training and career development opportunities, and establish clear communication channels between employees and management. The ultimate goal is to create a more engaged and motivated workforce to reduce potential labour agency costs.

Labour is sometimes aligned with stockholders and sometimes with management. They too share the same risk-averse strategy, since they cannot diversify their labour whereas the stockholders can diversify their stake in the equity. Risk averse projects reduce the risk of bankruptcy and in turn reduce the chances of job-loss. On the other hand, if the CEO is clearly underperforming then the company is in threat of a hostile takeover which is sometimes associated with job-loss. They are therefore likely to give the CEO considerable leeway in taking risk averse projects, but if the manager is clearly underperforming, they will likely signal that to the stockholders.

In 1995, the paper “The Provision of Incentives to Firms” was published in the Journal of Economic Literature and comprehensively reviewed the literature on providing incentives to firms. The authors pointed out that incentives are crucial for employee motivation and improving firm performance. Moreover, incentives can take many forms, including performance-based compensation, promotions, and career development opportunities. The paper also identifies factors that can influence the effectiveness of incentives in firms, such as incentive programmes, the characteristics of the workers subject to the programmes, and the level of competition in the labour market. In the end, the authors concluded that incentives could effectively improve firm performance. However, the design of each incentive programme is critical to its success. For instance, incentive programmes must be carefully structured to meet the interests of employees and managers. Published in the Journal of Business Research in 2015, the paper “The Impact of HR Practises on Labour Agency Costs” examines the relationship between human resource management (HRM) practises and labour agency costs. The authors claim that, by providing for the interests of both employees and managers, HR systems can help reduce labour agency costs. Moreover, every company sector increases its interest by increasing company profit. Furthermore, by emphasising communication, employee engagement, and training can help build trust between employees and managers, which can lead to higher employee engagement and lower employee turnover. In conclusion, the paper stated that HR practises for reducing labour agency costs could work significantly. However, this will depend on various factors, such as strategies and employee characteristics.

=== Other stakeholders ===
Other stakeholders such as the government, suppliers and customers all have their specific interests to look after and that might incur additional costs. Agency costs in the government may include the likes of government wasting taxpayers money to suit their own interest, which may conflict with the general tax-paying public who may want it used elsewhere on things such as health care and education. The literature however mainly focuses on the above categories of agency costs.

== In agricultural contracts ==
While complete contract theory is useful for explaining the terms of agricultural contracts, such as the sharing percentages in tenancy contracts (Steven N. S. Cheung, 1969), agency costs are typically needed to explain their forms. For example, piece rates are preferred for labor tasks where quality is readily observable, e.g. sharpened sugar cane stalks ready for planting. Where effort quality is difficult to observe, e.g. the uniformity of broadcast seeds or fertilizer, wage rates tend to be used. Allen and Lueck (2004) have found that farm organization is strongly influenced by diversity in the form of moral hazard such that crop and household characteristics explain the nature of the farm, even the lack of risk aversion. Roumasset (1995) finds that warranted intensification (e.g. due to land quality) jointly determines optimal specialization on the farm, along with the agency costs of alternative agricultural firms. Where warranted specialization is low, peasant farmers relying on household labor predominate. In high value-per-hectare agriculture, however, there is extensive horizontal specialization by task and vertical specialization between owner, supervisory personnel and workers. These agency theories of farm organization and agricultural allow for multiple shirking possibilities, in contrast to the principal-agency version of sharecropping and agricultural contracts (Stiglitz, 1974, 1988, 1988) which trades-off labor shirking vs. risk-bearing.

== See also ==
- Principal–agent problem
