= Just compensation =

U.S. Fifth Amendment right

Just compensation is a right enshrined in the Fifth Amendment to the U.S. Constitution (and counterpart state constitutions), which is invoked whenever private property is taken by eminent domain by the government. Under some state constitutions, it is also owed when the government "damages" private property.

Usually, the government files an eminent domain action to take private property for public use and just compensation is determined at trial if the landowner does not settle with the government. However, when the government fails to file an eminent domain action and pay for the taking, the owner may seek compensation in an action called inverse condemnation.

For reasons of expedience, courts generally use fair market value as the measure of just compensation. The primary evidence of fair market value in almost all eminent domain are appraisal reports created by the appraisers hired by both sides. Because of the difficulty in stopping the eminent domain process, and the sole issue typically being what just compensation is owed to a landowner, an eminent domain trial is often called a "battle of the appraisers."

== Estimating just compensation, generally ==
Market value is the prevailing, but not exclusive measure of determining the just compensation owed to a landowner under the Fifth Amendment. Fair Market Value is defined by appraisers as the most probable price, in terms of cash that would be paid by a willing buyer to a willing seller, each being fully informed of the property's good and bad features, with the property being exposed on the market for an adequate time to attract offers. But in eminent domain cases, fair market value is defined as the highest price obtainable in the open market with the value not being influenced by the imminence of the eminent domain taking. In other words, the property must be valued as if the project for which it is being taken did not exist — this is known as the "project influence" doctrine.

Market value does not include incidental losses (e.g., cost of moving), but some of these losses are made compensable in part by statutes, such as the federal Uniform Relocation Assistance Act (Code of Federal Regulations 49) and its state counterparts. As for business losses, the Supreme Court has held that an "exercise of the power of eminent domain which has the inevitable effect of depriving the owner of the going-concern value of his business is a compensable 'taking' of property." Nevertheless, many lower courts deny compensation for business losses on the theory that such losses are "speculative" or that the fair market value of the land should already account for the value of a business located on the land. The judicial denial of compensation for business losses inflicted when a business conducted on the taken land is destroyed by the taking, has been the subject of much controversy and severe criticism by legal commentators. Alaska, Minnesota, New Mexico, and Pennsylvania, allow for recovery of business losses.

Depending on the jurisdiction, the property owner's attorneys' and appraisers' fees may be paid by the condemnor. In California and New York an award of such fees is discretionary with the court while in others like South Carolina it is mandated. Moreover, property owners are always entitled to receive interest on the just compensation owed to them if the payment is delayed.

== Appraisals ==
Because eminent domain is difficult to prevent, in almost all eminent domain cases, the only issue to be determined at trial is the just compensation owed to the landowner and which party's appraisal of the condemned property is more credible. Accordingly, an eminent domain trial is often seen as a "battle of appraisers" because appraisals, as expressions of opinion, can vary dramatically for any given property. Although their valuations may be different, the appraisers for the condemnor and the condemnee both follow the same three-step process:

1. Determine the highest and best use of the property before determining the property's value;
2. Determine which appraisal methodology is most appropriate to use given the characteristics of the property or whether the appraiser should use more than one methodology; and
3. Come to an opinion on the fair market value of the property based on the methodology or methodologies used.

=== Determining the "highest and best use" of the property being condemned ===
The highest and best use of the property is often the most important factor in determining the fair market value of land being taken by condemnation. It is defined as "the reasonably probable use of property that results in the highest value." The determination of the highest and best use for the condemned property is the guidepost for an appraiser's determination of its value, dictating what methodologies they use in their appraisal.

According to the Appraisal Institute, the highest and best use of the property must be reasonably probable considering the property's physical characteristics, the land regulations and laws affecting the property (including the possibility of changing those regulations and laws), and must be financially feasible. Appraisers traditionally analyze alternative uses to a property to determine its highest and best use with the following criteria in descending order:

1. Legal permissibility

The legal permissibility criterion looks at how the property is zoned, building codes, private restrictions such as restrictive covenants or conservation easements, historic preservation district controls, and environmental regulations. All of which may preclude many potential land uses. Appraisers also consider the reasonable possibility of the property being rezoned by looking at other properties in the area and the municipality's comprehensive plan.

2. Physical possibility

The physical possibility criterion looks at the properties size, shape, topography, the soils on the property, whether utilities are available, access to the property via roads and other means, and other environmental considerations such as the presence of wetlands or floodplains.

3. Financial feasibility

To determine the financial feasibility of the project, appraisers look at the supply and demand in the area for the land use (e.g., if the highest and best use may be a gas station, the appraiser would look to see how many gas stations were located near the property). The appraiser also estimates the costs of demolishing and replacing the existing structures on the property as well as other expenses such as permitting fees. The appraiser then estimates the amount of net income that the new use of the property could generate and whether that net income would pay for the changes made to the property.

4. Maximum profitability

At the end of the analysis, the appraiser performs a comparative analysis of all financially feasible uses to determine which of the uses is the most profitable. The use that is the most profitable and satisfies the other three criterion is the highest and best use of the property.

=== Methods of valuation ===
==== Traditional methodologies ====
There are three traditional methodologies used by appraisers for determining the value of property and therefore the just compensation owed. These methodologies are:

- The sales comparison approach (comparing a property's characteristics with those of comparable properties that have recently sold in similar transactions).
- The cost approach (a comparison of the replacement cost of the structures/improvements on the property).
- The income capitalization approach (consists of methods, techniques, and mathematical procedures used to analyze a property’s income-earning).

In a typical assignment, an appraiser for a party in an eminent domain case uses all three methods and then determine which one most appropriately calculates the fair market value of the subject property. However, there are limitations for the use of each methodology. The cost approach cannot be used to appraise the value of vacant land and the sales comparison approach cannot be used to appraise unique/specialized properties such as a municipal garden or power plant.

===== The sales comparison approach =====
The sales comparison approach is the preferred approach by most courts in the determination of the fair market value of property. It is also the most widely used for residential property. With this approach, "an opinion of market value is developed by comparing properties similar to the subject property that have recently sold, are listed for sale, or are under contract (i.e., for which purchase offers and a deposit have been recently submitted)." The appraiser makes valuation adjustments to the valuation of the condemned property based on the similarities and differences of properties that recently sold. The adjustments made by each side's appraiser is one of the greatest contentions in the eminent domain trial.

The adjustments made are both quantitative and qualitative. Appraisers use several statistical or data analysis techniques to make the quantitative adjustments such as: variants of sensitivity analysis (e.g., paired or grouped data analysis), trend analysis, scenario analysis, and capitalization of income differences.

Appraisers typically first make financial adjustments between the sales of the comparables and the property being condemned. However, they are not required to do so if their analysis of the data they have collected indicate otherwise. The first five adjustments typically made are for the financing terms of each purchase, the property rights conveyed, the conditions of the sale, expenditures made shortly after the purchase, and market conditions. based on the financing used by the purchaser of the property and the market conditions on the date of the properties' sale. This is because property values fluctuate with supply and demand which is influenced by, among other things, shifts in financial markets and mortgage interest rates. When mortgage interest rates are high, there is less demand in the property market and properties sells for less than they would in a favorable market.

After the financial adjustments are made, the appraiser typically makes what are called the "property adjustments." These adjustments are for: "location, physical characteristics, economic characteristics, legal characteristics, and non-realty components."

The adjustments on various characteristics of the properties can result in large differences in the valuation of any given comparables and the property being condemned. But the general standard is for the adjustments to affect the valuation of the subject property by no more than 15 to 25 percent, as otherwise the appraisal would be based more on appraiser opinion and not substantiated by the use of the data-based approach.

In eminent domain cases, depending on the jurisdiction, the data collected on sales of similar properties may be admitted as direct evidence and/or as support for the appraiser's testimony. The party offering the comparative sales has the burden of proving that the properties are similar to the one being condemned (e.g., the properties have the same highest and best use, the date of sale was recent but not before the condemnation action was filed, the properties are located within economic proximity to each other, etc.).

===== The cost and income approaches =====
The cost approach is most applicable when the condemned property is specifically designed for a certain use and there are not comparable properties that can be used in the comparison sales method. Using this approach, the appraiser values the property by determining "how much it would cost to build or replace a similar piece of property."

The income capitalization approach "typically provides reliable indications of value for income producing properties." Using this approach, appraisers try to determine the property's market value by analyzing its capability to produce income. However, the evidence of income that the appraiser relies upon must be attributable to the property itself and not the business located on the property.

==== Nontraditional methodologies ====
The traditional three appraisal methodologies are not always suited for establishing the just compensation owed to a landowner. Those methodologies alone may be ill-suited to appraise unique property interests that are not fee simple title, or for appraising the just compensation owed to landowners in jurisdictions with protections in their state constitutions that require just compensation be paid to landowners when the government "damages" their property. For these reasons, appraisers may create hybrid or novel approaches to use in their appraisals for an eminent domain (or inverse condemnation) case. However, the admissibility of their opinions based on these methodologies is subject to jurisdictional rules of evidence on expert witness testimony.

== See also ==
Related legal articles:

- Lindsay v. Commissioners - 1796 interpretation of "just compensation", since overturned
- Eminent domain in the United States
- Confiscation
- Nationalization
- Search and seizure
