= Highest and best use =

Principle in real estate valuation

Highest and best use (or highest or best use; HBU) is a concept in real estate appraisal that originated with early economists such as Irving Fisher, who conceptualized the idea of maximum productivity.

According to the doctrine of "highest and best use," in any case where the market value of real property is sought, that value must be based on that use that would produce the highest value for a property, regardless of its actual current use.

== Definitions of highest and best use ==
The Appraisal Institute of Canada defines the term highest and best use as:

The reasonably probable and legal use of property, that is physically possible, appropriately supported, and financially feasible, and that results in the highest value.

The Appraisal Institute defines highest and best use as follows:

The reasonably probable and legal use of vacant land or an improved property that is physically possible, appropriately supported, financially feasible, and that results in the highest value. The four criteria the highest and best use must meet are legal permissibility, physical possibility, financial feasibility, and maximum productivity. Alternatively, the probable use of land or improved property – specific with respect to the user and timing of the use – that is adequately supported and results in the highest present value.".

In some cases, a proposed use might be the highest and best use but for some cost that changes the net economics. An example might be an industrially-used site that can now be used legally for high-rise residential buildings, but would cost so much to clean up (remediate) that the value as currently used is higher. In that case, if it can be continued, the existing industrial use could be the highest and best use. In some cases appraisers are given specific instructions as to an assumed highest and best use. This use might not pass the tests discussed below as a legitimate highest and best use, and may very well produce a different value. One example of this might be a parkland valuation, where the appraiser has been instructed to ignore all other possible uses. Further, the highest and best use of a property can be a class of uses (such as retail or multi family), rather than a specific use (i.e. development of a fast food restaurant).

== Test of highest and best use ==
In order to determine the maximum potential of a property Land Use developers often have to embark on a three-step analysis involving property analysis, entitlement and constraint analysis, and market analysis. In order to be considered as the highest and best use of a property however, any potential use must pass a series of tests. The exact definition of highest and best use varies, but generally the use must be the following:

- legally permissible
- physically possible
- financially feasible
- maximally productive

=== Legally permissible ===
Only those uses that are, or may be, legally permitted are potential highest and best uses. This may exclude uses that are not, and unlikely to become, permitted by zoning, land use planning, uses forbidden by government regulations, and uses prohibited by deed restrictions or covenants.

Properties with a use that predates existing zoning or other property regulations may be legally nonconforming. Such grandfathered uses are generally legal even though they do not meet current zoning or other regulations. Since their use predates these regulations, they are "grandfathered in". However, some such uses may not be reproduced if the legally nonconforming improvement is destroyed or damaged beyond a certain point.

"Legally permissible" can be a tricky conceptual test, because even uses that are currently not permitted may be considered. This happens when there is a reasonable prospect (at least 50%) that the regulation, zoning, deed restriction, etc. can be changed to permit the proposed use.

=== Physically possible ===
Any potential use must be physically possible given the size, shape, topography, and other characteristics of the site. For example, a 40,000-square-foot (3,700 m^{2}) single story warehouse would not fit on a 10,000-square-foot (930 m^{2}) site; therefore, that use would fail the physical possibility test.

=== Financial feasibility ===
The highest and best use of a property must be financially feasible: the proposed use of a property must generate adequate revenue to justify the costs of construction plus a profit for the developer. In the case of an improved property, with obvious remaining economic life, the question of financial feasibility is somewhat irrelevant. In the case of an improved property with limited remaining economic life, the question of financial feasibility becomes a question of the maximally productive use of the site. If the value of the land as vacant exceeds the value of the property as improved less reversion/demolition costs, then redevelopment of the site becomes the maximally productive use of the property, and continued use of the existing improvements that do not represent the highest net value of the site is considered to be financially unfeasible.

=== Maximally productive use ===
Finally, the use must generate the highest net return (profit) to the developer. A property that could hypothetically be developed with residential, commercial or industrial development might only have one of those uses as its highest and best use. These three hypothetical development scenarios follow to illustrate the test of maximally productive use of a $100,000 site:

- Industrial warehouse
  - Cost to construct 10,000 sq ft (930 m^{2}): $750,000
  - Market Value of 10,000 sq ft (930 m^{2}): $910,000
  - Profit for industrial development: 7%
- Retail strip center
  - Cost to construct 10,000 sq ft (930 m^{2}): $1,500,000
  - Market Value of 10,000 sq ft (930 m^{2}): $1,840,000
  - Profit for retail development: 15%
- Residential condominiums
  - Cost to construct 10,000 sq ft (930 m^{2}): $1,200,000
  - Market Value of 10,000 sq ft (930 m^{2}): $1,534,000
  - Profit for residential development: 18%

As the examples illustrate, even though the retail development results in the overall highest market value for the development, the residential development scenario results in the highest net return to the developer and this makes it the maximally productive use.

In reality, short term constraints on availability of capital and labour, inevitable conflicts between the other key factors, as well as the predisposition and experience of the developers, often lead to developments that are not maximally productive, but are a compromise. They are productive enough and safe enough that the developer proceeds, but they are not maximally productive. James Graaskamp fully developed a model that reflects this reality more clearly, and termed it most probable use.

== Vacant and improved ==
The Test of Highest and Best Use is applied to an improved property both as improved and as if vacant. Vacant properties are generally only given the as vacant test. The Highest and Best Use as vacant may be the same or different as the Highest and Best use as improved. For improved properties, the first analysis applied is the use of the property based on the assumption that the parcel is vacant. Then, the analysis focuses on the use that should be made of the property as it is currently improved. The extent to which the existing improvements differ from the highest and best use as-if vacant, reveals the extent of any functional obsolescence. Further, there are three potential actions that can be undertaken regarding the existing improvements: Retention of the existing improvements, modification of the improvements or the development scheme of the site, or demolition and removal of the improvements.

For example, house A in an area zoned for residential use may have a highest and best use as vacant and a highest and best use as improved that are both residential. A similar house B in a commercially zoned area may have a highest and best use as vacant as development to a commercial development, and the highest and best use as improved may be for continued use as a single family residence.

If the value of the commercial lot as vacant in "House B" exceeds the value of house as a residence as improved plus demolition costs, the overall highest and best use of this property would be the as vacant value of the commercial lot. For example, assume that "House B" has a value as a house of $200,000, and a site value as a commercial lot of $250,000 with a cost to demolish the house and prepare the site at $25,000. The highest and best use of the site is to demolish the house and sell the site as a commercial lot. The market value would be $225,000 ($250,000 site value minus $25,000 demolition cost). However, if the demolition costs rose to $55,000, the highest and best use would be the existing residential use, because the value as a commercial lot (now $195,000) would not exceed the existing value as a residence.

This would be the highest and best use of the property, even though it is contrary to what actually exists. Even if the house is not razed and the site sold as a commercial lot, the highest and best use is the commercial lot use. The market value of the property is driven by this hypothetical conversion, even if it never takes place, due to the utility that this potential conversion would bring to a purchaser.

== Economic theory ==
The economic concepts of utility and substitution drive the highest and best use analysis. The highest and best use of a property determines its utility to a potential purchaser. A purchaser will pay no more for a property than a competing property with the same utility would command, while a seller would accept no less than another seller of a comparable property.

== Other considerations ==
HBU is a designation to identify an entity that could have a higher value if used for a different purpose. There are many other similar concepts that are used in fields related to, yet outside of real estate appraisal as instructed in the Uniform Standards of Professional Appraisal Practice (USPAP). One example is Higher and Better Use (HBU), as explained below. According to an article prepared by an entity working with the US Fish and Wildlife Service, which was posted on the United States Fish and Wildlife Service website:

“These (HBUs) are defined as lands which have higher values for their non-timber amenities such as for recreation and conservation.”

Organizations such as the American Society of Farm Managers and Rural Appraisers (ASFMRA), the American Society of Appraisers (ASA) and the Appraisal Institute have issued guidance to their members stating that the use of non-economic valuation concepts such as the above must not be used in connection with concepts such as Market Value and Highest and Best Use when engaging in typical appraisal assignments. However, proponents of alternate valuation metrics point out that valuing land through a purely economic perspective often fails to capture important benefits to the public such as clean water, pleasing scenery, erosion control, and recreation. Public Interest Value”"”" is potentially the most well known alternate valuation concept and has been discussed by many authors and specifically addressed in the Uniform Standards for Federal Land Acquisition (UASFLA)”".

In appraisals, an entity is assessed at its highest or best use to maximize value and increase revenue. However, the value of an entity at its highest or best use may not be greater than the value of an entity in its present use if remediation is required to convert the entity to a different use.

== See also ==
- Land value tax
