= Uniform Residential Appraisal Report =

A Uniform Residential Appraisal Report (URAR) is one of the most common forms used in United States real estate appraisals. It was created to allow for standard reporting and analysis of single-family dwellings or single-family dwellings with an "accessory unit". It is also suitable for a building in a planned unit development (PUD) but is not meant to be used for appraisals of manufactured homes or condos.

The most current incarnation of the URAR is the Fannie Mae Form 1004 updated for March 2005. It is considered a full appraisal with all three approaches to value, cost approach, sales comparison approach, and income approach.

== Requirements ==
- The report requires an interior and exterior inspection of the subject property.
- An exterior building sketch of the improvements that indicates the dimensions.
- Clear, descriptive photographs of the subject property and comparable sales used.
- A street map that shows the location of the subject property and of all comparable properties that the appraiser used.

== Parts of the URAR ==
Some of the sections of a URAR include but are not limited to:

- Improvements: Physical characteristics of the property such as age, materials, and condition.
- Site: Data on the size, shape, zoning, and access to utilities as well as FEMA flood-zone information.
- Contract: Information on the contract for sale is entered here for appraisals in which a change of ownership is about to occur.
- Subject: Basic information such as the address, legal description, owner's and/or borrower's names. The client is also identified here.
- Sales comparison approach: The grid analysis, this is where the property being appraised is compared to recent sales of other properties.
- Subject Interior and Exterior Photos
- Additional Addendum
- Comparable Photos
- Signature Section
- Income approach
- Building Sketch
- Reconciliation
- Cost approach
- Location Map
- Aerial Map
- Flood Map
- Plat Map
- License
- E&O
