= Real estate appraisal =

Process of developing an opinion of value for real property

Real estate appraisal, home appraisal, property valuation or land valuation is the process of assessing the value of real property (usually market value).

Appraisal reports form the basis for mortgage loans, settling estates and insurance policies, taxation, etc. Sometimes an appraisal report is also used to establish a sale price for a property. Factors like size of the property, condition, age, and location play a key role in the valuation.

== Obtaining an appraisal ==
Appraisals are often required by lenders for issuing or refinancing a loan. In such cases, when the borrower asks the lender for a loan or a refinance, the lender will order an appraisal. Once ordered, the borrower will have to schedule an appointment with the appraiser for the in-home visit.

The appraiser will visit the property, assess it, gather data and leave. This usually takes a few hours, depending on the size of the property. After the on-site visit, the appraiser will spend time researching and preparing an appraisal report. The appraiser will provide the completed report to the lender within a couple business days. The borrower may also obtain the report upon request.

On average, the entire process of obtaining an appraisal takes from 5 to 15 days.

== Types of value ==
There are several types and definitions of value sought by a real estate appraisal. Some of the most common are:

- Market value – the price at which an asset would trade in a competitive Walrasian auction setting. Market value is usually interchangeable with open market value or fair value. International Valuation Standards (IVS) define:

Market value – the estimated amount for which an asset or liability should exchange on the valuation date between a willing buyer and a willing seller in an arm's length transaction, after proper marketing and where the parties had each acted knowledgeably, prudently and without compulsion.

- Value-in-use, or use value – the net present value (NPV) of a cash flow that an asset generates for a specific owner under a specific use. Value-in-use is the value to one particular user, and may be above or below the market value of a property.
- Investment value – the value to one particular investor, and may or may not be higher than the market value of a property. Differences between the investment value of an asset and its market value motivate buyers or sellers to enter the marketplace. International Valuation Standards (IVS) define:

Investment value – the value of an asset to the owner or a prospective owner for individual investment or operational objectives.

- Ad valorem tax value – the value used for taxation purposes, determined by the collection of data through the mass appraisal process. The mass appraisal process applies the data collected through various sources to real property to determine taxable value.
- Insurable value – the value of real property covered by an insurance policy. Generally, it does not include the site value.
- Liquidation value – may be analyzed as either a forced liquidation or an orderly liquidation and is a commonly sought standard of value in bankruptcy proceedings. It assumes a seller who is compelled to sell after an exposure period which is less than the market-normal time-frame.

=== Price vs value ===
There can be differences between what the property is worth (market value) and what it cost to buy it (price). A price paid might not represent that property's market value. Sometimes, special considerations may have been present, such as a special relationship between the buyer and the seller where one party had control or significant influence over the other party. In other cases, the transaction may have been just one of several properties sold or traded between two parties. In such cases, the price paid for any particular piece is not its market "value" (with the idea usually being, though, that all the pieces and prices add up to the market value of all the parts) but rather its market "price".

At other times, a buyer may willingly pay a premium price, above the generally accepted market value, if his subjective valuation of the property (its investment value for him) was higher than the market value. One specific example of this is an owner of a neighboring property who, by combining his property with the subject property (assemblage), could obtain economies-of-scale and added value (plottage value). Similar situations sometimes happen in corporate finance. For example, this can occur when a merger or acquisition happens at a price which is higher than the value represented by the price of the underlying stock. The usual explanation for these types of mergers and acquisitions is that "the sum is greater than its parts", since full ownership of a company provides full control of it. This is something that purchasers will sometimes pay a high price for. This situation can happen in real estate purchases too.

But the most common reason for value differing from price is that either the buyer or the seller is uninformed as to what a property's market value is but nevertheless agrees on a contract at a certain price which is either too expensive or too cheap. This is unfortunate for one of the two parties. It is the obligation of a real property appraiser to estimate the true market value of a property and not its market price.

Frequently, properties are assessed at a value below their market values; this is known as fractional assessment. Fractional assessment can result in properties that are assessed at 10% or less of their given market values.

=== Market value definitions in the United States ===
In the United States, appraisals are for a certain type of value (e.g., foreclosure value, fair market value, distressed sale value, investment value). The most commonly used definition of value is market value. While Uniform Standards of Professional Appraisal Practice (USPAP) does not define market value, it provides general guidance for how Market Value should be defined:

A type of value, stated as an opinion, that presumes the transfer of a property (i.e., a right of ownership or a bundle of such rights), as of a certain date, under specific conditions set forth in the definition of the term identified by the appraiser as applicable in an appraisal.

Thus, the definition of value used in an appraisal or current market analysis (CMA) analysis and report is a set of assumptions about the market in which the subject property may transact. It affects the choice of comparable data for use in the analysis. It can also affect the method used to value the property. For example, tree value can contribute up to 27% of property value. CMA reports are sometimes referred to as "pencil appraisals" or automated valuation model (AVM) reports, but these terms are incorrect even when they are part of real estate "shop talk."

== Main approaches to value ==
There are three traditional groups of methodologies for determining value. These are usually referred to as the "three approaches to value" which are generally independent of each other:

- The sales comparison approach (comparing a property's characteristics with those of comparable properties that have recently sold in similar transactions).
- The cost approach (the buyer will not pay more for a property than it would cost to build an equivalent).
- The income approach (similar to the methods used for financial valuation, securities analysis or bond pricing – where the implied property value is a function of the property's pro forma cash flow, or NOI in the context of real estate).

However, the recent trend of the business tends to be toward the use of a scientific methodology of appraisal which relies on the foundation of quantitative-data, risk, and geographical based approaches. Pagourtzi et al. have provided a review on the methods used in the industry by comparison between conventional approaches and advanced ones.

As mentioned before, an appraiser can generally choose from three approaches to determine value. One or two of these approaches will usually be most applicable, with the other approach or approaches usually being less useful. The appraiser has to think about the "scope of work", the type of value, the property itself, and the quality and quantity of data available for each approach. No overarching statement can be made that one approach or another is always better than one of the other approaches.

The appraiser has to think about the way that most buyers usually buy a given type of property. What appraisal method do most buyers use for the type of property being valued? This generally guides the appraiser's thinking on the best valuation method, in conjunction with the available data. For instance, appraisals of properties that are typically purchased by investors (e.g., skyscrapers, office buildings) may give greater weight to the income approach. Buyers interested in purchasing single family residential property would rather compare price, in this case, the sales comparison approach (market analysis approach) would be more applicable. The third and final approach to value is the cost approach to value. The cost approach to value is most useful in determining insurable value, and cost to construct a new structure or building.

For example, single apartment buildings of a given quality tend to sell at a particular price per apartment. In many of those cases, the sales comparison approach may be more applicable. On the other hand, a multiple-building apartment complex would usually be valued by the income approach, as that would follow how most buyers would value it. As another example, single-family houses are most commonly valued with the greatest weighting to the sales comparison approach. However, if a single-family dwelling is in a neighborhood where all or most of the dwellings are rental units, then some variant of the income approach may be more useful. So the choice of valuation method can change depending upon the circumstances, even if the property being valued does not change much.

=== The sales comparison approach ===
The sales comparison approach is based primarily on the principle of substitution. This approach assumes a prudent (or rational) individual will pay no more for a property than it would cost to purchase a comparable substitute property. The approach recognizes that a typical buyer will compare asking prices and seek to purchase the property that meets his or her wants and needs for the lowest cost. In developing the sales comparison approach, the appraiser attempts to interpret and measure the actions of parties involved in the marketplace, including buyers, sellers, and investors.

==== Data collection methods and valuation process ====
Data is collected on recent sales of properties similar to the subject being valued, called "comparables". Only SOLD properties may be used in an appraisal and determination of a property's value, as they represent amounts actually paid or agreed upon for properties. Sources of comparable data include real estate publications, public records, buyers, sellers, real estate brokers and/or agents, appraisers, and so on. Important details of each comparable sale are described in the appraisal report. Since comparable sales are not identical to the subject property, adjustments may be made for date of sale, location, style, amenities, square footage, site size, etc. The main idea is to simulate the price that would have been paid if each comparable sale were identical to the subject property. If the comparable is superior to the subject in a factor or aspect, then a downward adjustment is needed for that factor. Likewise, if the comparable is inferior to the subject in an aspect, then an upward adjustment for that aspect is needed. The adjustment is somewhat subjective and relies on the appraiser's training and experience. From the analysis of the group of adjusted sales prices of the comparable sales, the appraiser selects an indicator of value that is representative of the subject property. It is possible for various appraisers to choose a different indicator of value which ultimately will provide different property value.

==== Steps in the sales comparison approach ====
1. Research the market to obtain information pertaining to sales, and pending sales that are similar to the subject property
2. Investigate the market data to determine whether they are factually correct and accurate
3. Determine relevant units of comparison (e.g., sales price per square foot), and develop a comparative analysis for each
4. Compare the subject and comparable sales according to the elements of comparison and adjust as appropriate
5. Reconcile the multiple value indications that result from the adjustment (upward or downward) of the comparable sales into a single value indication

=== The cost approach ===
The cost approach was once called the summation approach. The theory is that the value of a property can be estimated by summing the land value and the depreciated value of any improvements. The value of the improvements is often referred to by the abbreviation RCNLD (for "reproduction/replacement cost new less depreciation"). Reproduction refers to reproducing an exact replica; replacement cost refers to the cost of building a house or other improvement which has the same utility, but using modern design, workmanship and materials. In practice, appraisers almost always use replacement cost and then deduct a factor for any functional dis-utility associated with the age of the subject property. An exception to the general rule of using the replacement cost is for some insurance value appraisals. In those cases, reproduction of the exact asset after a destructive event like a fire is the goal.

In most instances when the cost approach is involved, the overall methodology is a hybrid of the cost and sales comparison approaches (representing both the suppliers' costs and the prices that customers are seeking). For example, the replacement cost to construct a building can be determined by adding the labor, material, and other costs. On the other hand, land values and depreciation must be derived from an analysis of comparable sales data.

The cost approach is considered most reliable when used on newer structures, but the method tends to become less reliable for older properties. The cost approach is often the only reliable approach when dealing with special use properties (e.g., public assembly, marinas). However, it is important to consider if there is actually a market for the use and all forms of obsolescence. Some special use properties lack an active market such that the cost approach may not be reliable either and may be more indicative of a use value or such. In some cases, it may be appropriate to consider alternative uses.

==== Obsolescence ====
The cost approach requires adjustments for obsolescence, stemming from three sources.

- Physical (depreciation) - Reduction based on the wearing-out of the physical components
- Functional - Loss in value for some functional or design aspect of the property
- External - Loss in value for something outside of the property

Physical depreciation is most familiar. As a structure ages, there is an effect on value. For example, buyers may reduce prices because they expect to make expensive replacements soon. Or in other cases, buyers expect higher utility expenses because they figure the property has older and worn insulation.

Functional obsolescence relates to the design of the property. It could be something that is inadequate about a property (say a house that lacks a swimming pool in a hot climate like Arizona) or something that is superadequate (say a 2-bedroom house that has 9 bathrooms). In either case, there is a deduction to the value compared to the costs of the structures that are there. For example, the 9 bathrooms all cost the same to construct but they add less and less. The appraisal should evaluate whether it is feasible to cure (fix) the item - that is, consider if the increase in value by fixing it exceeds the cost of the fix.

External obsolescence is something outside of the property. It could be changes in market conditions, or an undesirable neighboring property. External obsolescence cannot be fixed.

=== The income approach ===
The income capitalization Approach (often referred to simply as the "income approach") is used to value commercial and investment properties. Because it is intended to directly reflect or model the expectations and behaviors of typical market participants, this approach is generally considered the most applicable valuation technique for income-producing properties, where sufficient market data exists.

In a commercial income-producing property this approach capitalizes an income stream into a value indication. This can be done using revenue multipliers or capitalization rates applied to a Net Operating Income (NOI). Usually, an NOI has been stabilized so as not to place too much weight on a very recent event. An example of this is an unleased building which, technically, has no NOI. A stabilized NOI would assume that the building is leased at a normal rate, and to usual occupancy levels. The Net Operating Income (NOI) is gross potential income (GPI), less vacancy and collection loss (= Effective Gross Income) less operating expenses (but excluding debt service, income taxes, and/or depreciation charges applied by accountants).

Alternatively, multiple years of net operating income can be valued by a discounted cash flow analysis (DCF) model. The DCF model is widely used to value larger and more expensive income-producing properties, such as large office towers or major shopping centres. This technique applies market-supported yields (or discount rates) to projected future cash flows (such as annual income figures and typically a lump reversion from the eventual sale of the property) to arrive at a present value indication. In Canada, reversion values typically range from 16x-21x the NOI of year of sale.

When homes are purchased for personal use the buyer can validate the asking price by using the income approach in the opposite direction. An expected rate of return can be estimated by comparing net expected costs to the asking price. This return can be compared to the home owner's other investing opportunities.

=== UK valuation methods ===
In the United Kingdom, valuation methodology has traditionally been classified into five methods:

1. Comparative method. Used for most types of property where there is good evidence of previous sales. This is analogous to the sales comparison approach outlined above.

2. Investment method, also known as hardcore. Used for most commercial (and residential) property that is producing future cash flows through the letting of the property. This method compares the estimated rental value (ERV), or "top slice" to the current ("passing") income, or "bottom slice", to give an indication of whether the future value of the property should rise or fall based on income. If a property's income is higher than the ERV this is sometimes known as "froth", which may be confused with the US use of "froth" describing the period before a real estate bubble.

The cash flows can be compared to the market-determined equivalent yield, and the property value can be determined by means of a simple model. Note that this method is really a comparison method, since the main variables are determined in the market. In standard U.S. practice, however, the closely related capitalizing of NOI is confounded with the DCF method under the general classification of the income capitalization approach (see above).

3. Residual method. Used for properties ripe for development or redevelopment or for bare land only. The site or unimproved property value is based on the improved or developed value less costs of construction, professional fees, development finance costs and a developer's profit or return on risk.

4. Profit method. Used for trading properties where evidence of rates is slight, such as hotels, restaurants and old-age homes. A three-year average of operating income (derived from the profit and loss or income statement) is capitalized using an appropriate yield. Note that since the variables used are inherent to the property and are not market-derived, therefore unless appropriate adjustments are made, the resulting value will be value-in-use or investment value, not market value.

5. Cost method. Used for land and buildings of special character for which profit figures cannot be obtained or land and buildings for which there is no market because of their public service or heritage characteristics. Both the residual method and the cost method would be grouped in the United States under the cost approach (see above).

Under the current RICS Valuation Standards, the following bases of value are recognized:

- Market value (see PS 3.2)
- Market rent (see PS 3.3)
- Worth (investment value) (see PS 3.4)
- Fair value (see PS 3.5)

==== Practice in the UK ====
The common public experience of chartered surveyors is in the process of obtaining a mortgage loan. A mortgage valuation is required by any mortgage lender as a condition of obtaining a mortgage loan. The homebuyer may take the option to instruct the same surveyor to carry out a "RICS HomeBuyer Report" or a "RICS Building Survey" (sometimes called a "Structural Survey"), usually at additional cost.

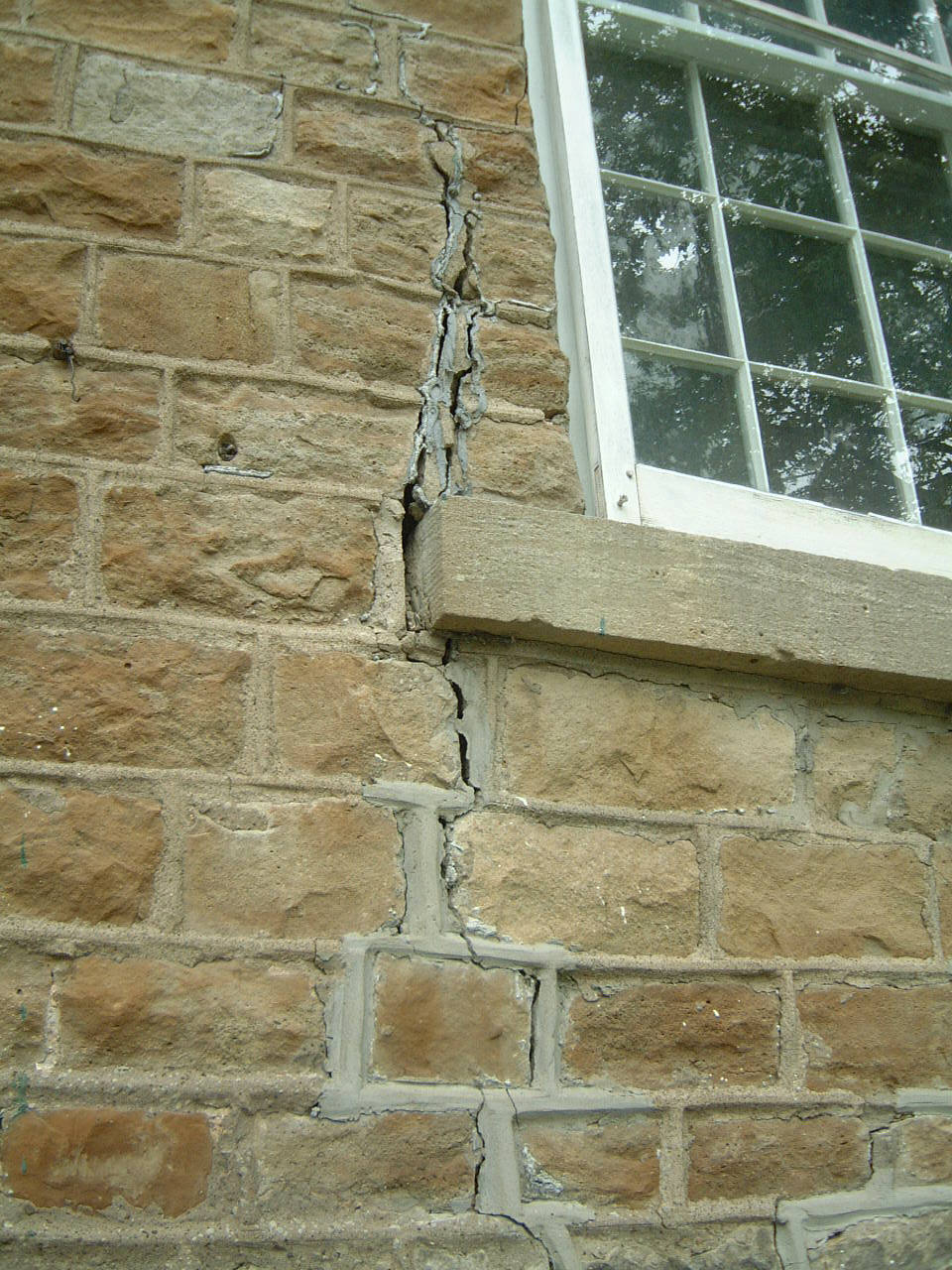
A structural defect

A mortgage valuation is for the benefit of the lender. Its purpose is merely to confirm the property is worth the price paid, in order to protect the lender's interests.

The building survey is the most detailed survey available from most firms of chartered surveyors. Thorough though it is, it may still lead to recommendations for further investigation from other specialists; see below. However, A competent surveyor will always try to investigate causes of damp and building defects before recommending for further investigation. The building survey report is much longer than the condition report but may not be much longer than the homebuyer report as its content depends on the condition observed in each individual case. The practice note version building survey looks in more detail at the property to report on the visual condition and maintenance needs of nine external elements of construction, with scope for sub-division into individual features, with the nine internal elements of construction and the seven services supplied to the building examined in a similar manner. Also, the three key components of the grounds in which the property is sited can be subdivided as necessary.

The chartered surveyor's inspection is typically non-intrusive. They do not have the authority to lift floorboards, drill holes, or perform excavations at a property which the prospective buyer does not, at this stage, own, which means that certain defects or problems may not be apparent from their inspection.

Their fees are a component of the cost of moving house in the United Kingdom.

== Appraisers ==
Besides the mandatory educational grade, which can vary from Finance to Construction Technology, most, but not all, countries require appraisers to have the license for the practice. Usually, the real estate appraiser has the opportunity to reach 3 levels of certification: Appraisal Trainee, Licensed Appraiser and Certified Appraiser. The second and third levels of license require no less than 2000 experience hours in 12 months and 2500 experience hours in no less than 24 months respectively. Appraisers are often known as "property valuers" or "land valuers"; in British English they are "valuation surveyors". If the appraiser's opinion is based on market value, then it must also be based on the highest and best use of the real property. In the United States, mortgage valuations of improved residential properties are generally reported on a standardized form like the Uniform Residential Appraisal Report. Appraisals of more commercial properties (e.g., income-producing, raw land) are often reported in narrative format and completed by a Certified General Appraiser.

== Further considerations ==
=== Scope of work ===
While the Uniform Standards of Professional Appraisal Practice (USPAP) has always required appraisers to identify the scope of work needed to produce credible results, it became clear in recent years that appraisers did not fully understand the process for developing this adequately. In formulating the scope of work for a credible appraisal, the concept of a limited versus complete appraisal and the use of the Departure Rule caused confusion to clients, appraisers, and appraisal reviewers. To deal with this, USPAP was updated in 2006 with what came to be known as the Scope of Work Project. Following this, USPAP eliminated both the Departure Rule and the concept of a limited appraisal, and a new Scope of Work rule was created. In this, appraisers were to identify six key parts of the appraisal problem at the beginning of each assignment:

- Client and other intended users
- Intended use of the appraisal and appraisal report
- Definition of value (e.g., market, foreclosure, investment)
- Any hypothetical conditions or extraordinary assumptions
- Effective date of the appraisal analysis
- Salient features of the subject property

Based on these factors, the appraiser must identify the scope of work needed, including the methodologies to be used, the extent of the investigation, and the applicable approaches to value. Currently, minimum standards for scope of work are:

- Expectations of the client and other users
- The actions of the appraiser's peers who carry out similar assignments

The scope of work is the first step in any appraisal process. Without a strictly defined scope of work, an appraisal's conclusions may not be viable. By defining the scope of work, an appraiser can properly develop a value for a given property for the intended user, and for the intended use of the appraisal. The whole idea of "scope of work" is to provide clear expectations and guidelines for all parties as to what the appraisal report does, and does not, cover; and how much work has gone into it.

=== Types of ownership interest ===
The type of real estate "interest" that is being valued, must also be known and stated in the report. Usually, for most sales, or mortgage financings, the fee simple interest is being valued. The fee simple interest is the most complete bundle of rights available. However, in many situations, and in many societies which do not follow English Common Law or the Napoleonic Code, some other interest may be more common. While there are many different possible interests in real estate, the three most common are:

- Fee simple value (known in the UK as freehold) – The most complete ownership in real estate, subject in common law countries to the powers reserved to the state (taxation, escheat, eminent domain, and police power)
- Leased fee value – This is simply the fee simple interest encumbered by a lease. If the lease is at market rent, then the leased fee value and the fee simple value are equal. However, if the tenant pays more or less than market, the residual owned by the leased fee holder, plus the market value of the tenancy, may be more or less than the fee simple value.
- Leasehold value – The interest held by a tenant. If the tenant pays market rent, then the leasehold has no market value. However, if the tenant pays less than the market, the difference between the present value of what is paid and the present value of market rents would be a positive leasehold value. For example, a major chain retailer may be able to negotiate a below-market lease to serve as the anchor tenant for a shopping center. This leasehold value may be transferable to another anchor tenant, and if so the retail tenant has a positive interest in the real estate.

Valuer and Valuation:

A "valuer" is an individual or professional who is trained and qualified to determine the value of assets, typically real estate or personal property, for various purposes. Valuers assess the worth or fair market value of these assets based on their knowledge, expertise, and analysis of relevant data.

"Valuation" refers to the process of determining the value or worth of an asset, property, business, or financial instrument. Valuation can be performed for a wide range of reasons, including businesses, assets, etc.

=== Home inspection ===
If a home inspection is performed prior to the appraisal and that report is provided to the appraiser, a more useful appraisal can result. This is because the appraiser, who is not an expert home inspector, will be told if there are substantial construction defects or major repairs required. This information can cause the appraiser to arrive at a different, probably lower, opinion of value. This information may be particularly helpful if one or both of the parties requesting the appraisal may end up in possession of the property. This is sometimes the case with property in a divorce settlement or a legal judgment.

== Mass appraisal and automated valuation models ==
Automated valuation models (AVMs) are growing in acceptance. These rely on statistical models such as multiple regression analysis, or machine learning algorithms. While AVMs can be quite accurate, particularly when used in a very homogeneous area, there is also evidence that AVMs are not accurate in other instances such as when they are used in rural areas, or when the appraised property does not conform well to the neighborhood.

Computer-assisted mass appraisal (CAMA) is a generic term for any software package used by government agencies to help establish real estate appraisals for property tax calculations. A CAMA is a system of appraising property, usually only certain types of real property, that incorporates computer-supported statistical analyses such as multiple regression analysis and adaptive estimation procedure to assist the appraiser in estimating value.

Geographic-assisted mass appraisal (GAMA) is a generic term for any geographic information system-centric software package used by government agencies to help establish real estate appraisals for property tax calculations.

Spatial-CAMA (SCAMA) is a general term for mass appraisal where spatial data is used with spatial dependence or spatial heterogeneity models. Spatial Lag Model (SLM) and Spatial Autoregressive Moving Average (SARMA) fall under spatial dependence while Geographically Weighted Regression Models (GWR) falls under spatial heterogeneity.

== Uniform Appraisal Dataset (UAD) and Uniform Residential Appraisal Report (URAR) ==
In 2025, real estate appraisal is evolving significantly with major changes not yet fully reflected on the Wikipedia page you provided. Key developments include the overhaul of the Uniform Appraisal Dataset (UAD) and Uniform Residential Appraisal Report (URAR), which are transitioning from static forms to dynamic, flexible reports tailored to property types and lender requirements. This change aims to improve appraisal accuracy, consistency, and turnaround times. There is also increased use of AI and machine learning technologies to enhance appraisal precision, efficiency, and cost-effectiveness by analyzing vast data sets and recognizing patterns in real estate markets. These AI systems update valuation models in real-time with current market data, although human appraiser judgment remains crucial for assessing unique property features.

== Governing authorities and professional organizations ==
=== International ===
The various U.S. appraisal groups and international professional appraisal organizations have started collaborating in recent years towards the development of International Valuation Standards.Living near important business districts provides several advantages

The International Valuation Standards Council (IVSC) is a non-governmental organization (NGO) member of the United Nations with membership that encompasses all the major national valuation standard-setters and professional associations from 150 different countries (including the Appraisal Institute, the American Society of Appraisers, the RICS, the [Practising Valuers Association of India] and the Appraisal Institute of Canada). IVSC publishes the International Valuation Standards (IVS), now in its 12th edition.

=== Germany ===
In Germany, real estate appraisal is known as real estate valuation (Immobilienbewertung). Real estate appraisers (Immobilienbewerter or Gutachter) can qualify to become a Öffentlich bestellter und vereidigter Sachverständiger (officially appointed and sworn expert). However, this formerly very important title has lost a lot of its importance over the past years, but still is of some value in court procedures. The title is not generally required for appraisals.

==== Governing authorities ====
Real estate appraisal in Germany is partly codified by law. The federal Baugesetzbuch (abbr. BauGB, "German statutory code on building and construction'") contains guidelines on governing authorities, defines the term market value and refers to continuative rules (chapter 3, articles 192 ff.). Each municipality (city or administrative district) must form a Gutachterausschuss (appraisal committee), consisting of a chairman and honorary members. The committee gathers information on all real estate deals (it is mandatory to send a copy of each notarial purchase contract to the Gutachterausschuss) and includes it in the Kaufpreissammlung (purchase price database). Most committees publish an official real estate market report every two years, in which besides other information on comparables the land value is determined. The committees also perform appraisals on behalf of public authorities.

==== Federal regulations ====
The BauGB defines the Verkehrswert or Marktwert (market value, both terms with identical meaning) as follows: "The market value is determined by the price that can be realized at the date of valuation, in an arm's length transaction, with due regard to the legal situation and the effective characteristics, the nature and lay of the premises or any other subject of the valuation" (non-official translation). The intention, as in other countries, is to include all objective influences and to exclude all influences resulting from the subjective circumstances of the involved parties.

This federal law is supported by the Wertermittlungsverordnung (abbr. WertV, "regulation on the determination of value"). The WertV defines the codified valuation approaches and the general valuation technique. German codified valuation approaches (other approaches such as DCF or residual approach are also permitted, but not codified) are the:

- Vergleichswertverfahren (sales comparison approach) – used where good evidence of previous sales is available and for owner-occupied assets, especially condominiums and single-family houses;
- Ertragswertverfahren (German income approach) – standard procedure for property that produces future cash flows from the letting of the property;
- Sachwertverfahren (German cost approach) – used for specialised property where none of the above approaches applies, e. g. public buildings.

WertV's general regulations are further supported by the Wertermittlungsrichtlinie (abbr. WertR, "directive on the determination of value"). The WertR provides templates for calculations, tables (e.g., economic depreciation) and guidelines for the consideration of different influences. WertV and WertR are not binding for appraisals for nonofficial use, nonetheless, they should be regarded as best practice or Generally Accepted (German) Valuation Practice (GAVP).

==== Comments on German GAVP ====
In most regards Generally Accepted (German) Valuation Principles is consistent with international practice. The investment market weighs the income approach most heavily. However, there are some important differences:

- Land and improvements are treated separately. German GAVP assumes that the land can be used indefinitely, but the buildings have a limited lifespan; This coincides with the balancing of the assets. The value of the land is determined by the sales comparison approach in both the income and cost approaches, using the data accumulated by the Gutachterausschuss which is then added to the building value.
- In order to account for the usage of the land, the net operating income is reduced by the Liegenschaftszins (interest paid to the land-owner by the owner of the building, i.e., ground rent). The Liegenschaftszins is the product of the land value and the Liegenschaftszinssatz (interest rate for land use). The Liegenschaftszinssatz is the equivalent of the yield—with some important differences—and is also determined by the Gutachterausschuss.
- Unlike the All Risks Yield (ARY) in UK practice, the Liegenschaftszinssatz (abbr. LZ) does not include an allowance for default (not to be confused with a structural vacancy), therefore this needs to be subtracted from gross operating income. As a result, the Liegenschaftszinssatz will usually be lower than the All Risks Yield.
- Based on the assumption that the economic life of the improvements is limited, the yield and remaining economic life determine the building value from the net operating income.
- Contracts in Germany generally prescribe that the landlord bears a higher portion of maintenance and operating costs than their counterparts in the United States and the UK.

==== Criticism ====
Mathematically the distinction between land and improvements in the income approach will have no impact on the overall value when the remaining economic life is more than thirty years. For this reason, it has become quite common to use the Vereinfachtes Ertragswertverfahren (simplified income approach), omitting the land value and the Liegenschaftszins. However, the separate treatment of land and buildings leads to more precise results for older buildings, especially for commercial buildings, which typically have a shorter economic life than residential buildings.

An advantage of the comparatively high degree of standardization practiced by professional appraisers is the greater ability to check an appraisal for inconsistency, accuracy and transparency.

==== Professional organizations ====
The Federal German Organisation of Appointed and Sworn Experts (Bundesverband Deutscher Sachverständiger und Fachgutachter, abbr. BDSF) is the main professional organization encompassing the majority of licensed appraisers in Germany. In recent years, with the move towards a more global outlook in the valuation profession, the RICS has gained a foothold in Germany, somewhat at the expense of the BDSF. Another German Organisation of Appointed and Sworn Experts is the Deutsche Sachverständigen Gesellschaft, abbr. DESAG. This organization also includes a large number of licensed appraisers in Germany.

With special focus on hypothetical value, in 1996, German banks with real estate financing activities formed the HypZert GmbH, an association for the certification of real estate valuers. A HypZert qualification is regarded as mandatory by many German banks.

=== Israel ===
In Israel, the real estate appraisal profession is regulated by the Council of Land Valuers, an organ of the Ministry of Justice; the largest professional organization, encompassing the majority of appraisers/land valuers is the Association of Land Valuers. Valuers must be registered with the Council, which is a statutory body set up by law, and which oversees the training and administers the national professional exams that are a prerequisite for attaining registration. In 2005 the Council set up a Valuation Standards Committee with the purpose of developing and promulgating standards that would reflect best practice; these have tended to follow a rules-based approach.

Historically, most valuations in Israel were statutory valuations (such as valuations performed for purposes of Betterment Tax, a tax administered on any gains accruing to the property by way of changes to the local planning) as well as valuations performed for purposes of bank lending. Since Israel implemented the International Financial Reporting Standards (IFRS) in 2008, the profession has been engaged in performing valuations for purposes of financial reporting.

=== United Arab Emirates ===
In the UAE, real estate appraisal is licensed and regulated by the Dubai Real Estate Regulatory Agency. Valuations are carried out by regulated firms, AVMs such as YallaValue, or even the Dubai Land Department itself.

=== United Kingdom ===
In the UK, real estate appraisal is known as property valuation and a real estate appraiser is a land valuer or property valuer (usually a qualified chartered surveyor who specializes in property valuation). Property valuation in the UK is regulated by the Royal Institution of Chartered Surveyors (RICS), a professional body encompassing all of the building and property-related professions. The RICS professional guidelines for valuers are published in what is commonly known as the Red Book. The 2017 version was the RICS Valuation – Global Standards (1 July 2017), superseding an edition published in 2011. RICS Valuation Standards contains mandatory rules, best practice guidance and related commentary. The 2017 version adopts and applies the International Valuation Standards (IVS) published by the International Valuation Standards Council (IVSC). Changes to the standards are approved by the RICS Valuation Professional Group Board, and the Red Book is updated accordingly on a regular basis. While based in the UK, RICS is a global organization and has become very active in the United States in recent years through its affiliation with the Counselors of Real Estate, a division of the National Association of Realtors.

=== United States ===
Appraisal practice in the United States is regulated by state. The Appraisal Foundation (TAF) is the primary standards body; its Appraisal Standards Board (ASB) promulgates and updates best practices as codified in the Uniform Standards of Professional Appraisal Practice (USPAP), while its Appraisal Qualifications Board (AQB) promulgates minimum standards for appraiser certification and licensing.

The federal government regulates appraisers indirectly because if the Appraisal Subcommittee (ASC) of the Federal Financial Institutions Examination Council (FFIEC) finds that a particular state's appraiser regulation and certification program is inadequate, then under federal regulations all appraisers in that state would no longer be eligible to conduct appraisals for federally chartered banks. The ASC oversees the TAF. Banks make widespread use of mortgage loans and mortgage-backed securities, and would be unable to do so without appraisals.

The Financial Institutions Reform, Recovery, and Enforcement Act of 1989 (FIRREA) demanded all the states to develop systems for licensing and certifying real estate appraisers. To accomplish this, the Appraisal Subcommittee (ASC) was formed within the FFIEC, with representatives from the various Federal mortgage regulatory agencies. Thus, currently all the real estate appraisers must be state-licensed and certified. But prior to the 1990s, there were no commonly accepted standards either for appraisal quality or for appraiser licensure. In the 1980s, an ad-hoc committee representing various appraisal professional organizations in the United States and Canada met to codify the best practices into what became known as the USPAP. The U.S. Savings and Loan Crisis resulted in increased federal regulation via FIRREA, which required federal lending regulators to adopt appraisal standards. A nonprofit organization, The Appraisal Foundation (TAF), was formed by the same organizations that had developed USPAP, and the copyright for USPAP was signed over to TAF. Federal oversight of TAF is provided by the Appraisal Subcommittee, made up of representatives of various federal lending regulators. TAF carries out its work through two boards: the Appraisal Standards Board promulgates and updates USPAP; the Appraisal Qualifications Board (AQB) promulgates minimum recommended standards for appraiser certification and licensure. During the 1990s, all of the states adopted USPAP as the governing standards within their states and developed licensure standards which met or exceeded the recommendations of TAF. Also, the various state and federal courts have adopted USPAP for real estate litigation and all of the federally lending regulators adopt USPAP for mortgage finance appraisal.

==== Professional organizations ====
In addition, there are professional appraisal organizations, organized as private non-profit organizations that date to the Great Depression of the 1930s. One of the oldest in the United States is the American Society of Farm Managers and Rural Appraisers (ASFMRA), which was founded in 1929. Others were founded as needed and the opportunity arose in specialized fields, such as the Appraisal Institute (AI) and the American Society of Appraisers (ASA) founded in the 1930s, the International Right of Way Association and the National Association of Realtors which were founded after World War II. These organizations all existed to establish and enforce standards, but their influence waned with increasing government regulation. In March 2007, three of these organizations (ASFMRA, ASA, and AI) announced an agreement in principle to merge. NAIFA (National Association of Independent Fee Appraisers), a charter member of The Appraisal Foundation, helped to write Title XI, the Real Estate Appraisal Reform Amendments. It was founded in 1961.

One of the most recognized professional organizations of real estate appraisers in America is the Appraisal Institute (AI). It was formed from the merger of the American Institute of Real Estate Appraisers and the Society of Real Estate Appraisers. Founded along with others in the 1930s, the two organizations merged in the 1990s to form the AI. This group awards four professional designations: SRA, to residential appraisers, AI-RRS, to residential review appraisers, MAI, to commercial appraisers, and AI-GRS, to commercial review appraisers. The Institute has enacted rigorous regulations regarding the use and display of these designations. For example, contrary to popular belief, "MAI" does not stand for "Member, Appraisal Institute". According to the institute, the letters "do not represent specific words", and an MAI may not use the words "Member, Appraisal Institute" in lieu of the MAI mark. The primary motive for this rule is to prevent trademark dilution. These designations require attendance in appraisal technique classes, ethical training, exams, and a review of the candidate's work by designated appraisers.

The National Association of Appraisers (NAA) was formed with a purpose of uniting those engaged in the appraisal profession for the purpose of exerting a beneficial influence upon the profession and to advocate appraiser interests. The NAA has established an advisory group consisting of leadership at the state organizations and coalitions called the Board of Governors where those states can help guide the NAA in acting in the best interest of all appraisers. The NAA also has a designated membership, MNAA (Member of the National Association of Appraisers, who is an individual who holds an appraisal license, certification or similar appraisal credential issued by a governmental agency; and who accepts the membership requirements and objectives of the National Association of Appraisers.

Other leading appraisal organizations include the National Association of Independent Fee Appraisers and the National Association of Master Appraisers, which were also founding sponsor-members of the Appraisal Foundation. The Massachusetts Board of Real Estate Appraisers (MBREA), founded in 1934, is the only state appraisal association that has been named a sponsor of the Appraisal Foundation. In recent years, the Royal Institution of Chartered Surveyors (RICS) has become highly regarded in the United States, and has formed a collaboration with the Counselors of Real Estate, a division of the National Association of Realtors. RICS, which is headquartered in London, operates on a global scale and awards the designations MRICS and FRICS to Members and Fellows of RICS. The Real Estate Counseling Group of America is a small group of top U.S. appraisers and real estate analysts who have collectively authored a disproportionately large body of appraisal methodology and, the National Association of Real Estate Appraisers (NAREA), founded in 1966, with the goal to elevate the professionalism and success of the Appraisal Industry.

The leading appraisal organization for personal property valuation is the American Society of Appraisers which is a sponsor member of the Appraisal Foundation and awards the ASA (Accredited Senior Appraiser) designation to candidates who complete five years of documented appraisal experience, pass a comprehensive exam along with required commercial and/or residential appraisal coursework, and submit two appraisal reports for review.

==== Racial bias ====
Implicit bias and racial composition of neighborhoods have long been thought to impact on home appraisal values. Recent studies from Freddie Mac and other industry leaders have confirmed that traditional modelling based on comparable sales and a variety of other factors (income, credit score, etc.) cannot explain the appraisal value gap minorities face. Some would argue that these pricing disparities are partially explained by neighborhood quality, which opponents say is a byproduct of historical redlining.

=== Russia ===
In Russia, on par with many other former Soviet Union economies, the profession emerged in the first half of 1990, and represented a clean break with the former practice of industry-specific pricing specialists and with activities of statutory price-setting authorities in the Soviet Union. Currently, property valuation, as it is called, is a specialism within general-purpose "valuation profession", which functions in a self-regulatory mode overseen by "self-regulated professional organizations" of valuers (SROs), i.e. public supervisory entities established under provisions of special legislation (which very loosely can be likened to trade unions). The principal among those is Russian Society of Appraisers, established in 1993 and presently exercising oversight over about half of the valuation profession membership. Among its 6000+ members a sizeable majority are real property valuers, rubbing shoulders with business and intangible assets appraisers. The latter categories of valuers are also allowed to value property, though valuation professionals tend to specialize. In late 2016, it was mandated that valuers should pass through compulsory state-administered attestation process to verify their competence, the details of which as to breakdown in specialization or otherwise remain to be hammered out.

As of mid-2016, Valuers in Russia, including real property valuers, are deemed to be purposely educated individuals maintaining their Valuation SRO membership and bearing unlimited property liability for the result of their services, that is their professional status is modeled on the organization of public notaries. Regardless of the fact, over 80% of valuers tend to be employed by valuation or consulting companies, and thus do not enter practice as stand-alone individual entrepreneurs. High-end appraisal services are principally represented by valuation arms of the International "Big-four" consultancies in the country, but there also exist reputable national corporate valuation brands.

The majority of property valuations in the country are typically conducted to meet legal requirements outlined in the Federal Valuation Law, with the most recent amendment taking place in 2016. Additionally, other related laws, such as the Joint Stock Companies Law, outline over 20 instances where valuations are mandated. These mandatory cases include valuations for purposes such as privatization, securing loans, handling bankruptcy and liquidation proceedings, among others.

Before the year 2000, valuations for corporate financial reporting held greater significance. However, this changed when the national accounting regulator discontinued its promotion of the accounting fair value option. Currently, the government is in the process of outsourcing the mass appraisal of properties for taxation purposes to professional valuation institutions.

Adjudication of valuer-certified estimates of value in case of the onset of disputes is conducted through the Experts Councils of valuers' SROs. Official courts tend to concur with the resolutions of such Councils. In some rare instances the imprimatur of SRO's Experts Councils is also required for a valuation done by a particular valuer to enter into effect.

The technical details of practice of real estate valuers in Russia are aligned with the international pattern. Members of the Russian Society of Appraisers formerly were bound by the observance of the International Valuation Standards. There also exists a set of 14 general-purpose government-developed "Federal Valuation Standards" (FSOs 1,2,3 --are the general valuation standards first adopted in 2007 (and revised 2015) and covering Terms of engagement and Valuation report content requirements, FSOs 7–11 are asset-specific standards adopted in 2015, while FSO 9 is currently the only purpose-specific standard in the set dealing with valuations of property for loan security purposes; the last two FSO standards adopted in 2016 cover determination of investment and liquidation values, however, they do not touch on the methodology for determining these values, only scraping the reporting requirements). In view of the international conformity drive in the latest round of FSO standards setting, general requirements in the new FSO standards are close to those in the International Valuation standards set; however, they can be more specific on occasion and mandate compulsory disclosure of uncertainty in valuation reports using the interval/range format.

With effect from 1 August 2017, new amendments to the Federal Valuation Law came to impose the compulsory certification of valuers by a state-affiliated testing centre. Consequently, this two-hour written exam certification measure, aimed to counter a perception of widespread malpractice among the members of the national valuation profession, provides for three valuer-specializations: real estate valuers, plant and machinery valuers, and business and intangible asset valuers, with the exam content requirements varying substantially for each specialization. Valuers would lose a right to practice, unless they comply with the requirement to take this compulsory certification exam at or before 31 March 2018. A general assessment of this measure is that the numbers of certified valuers in Russia are set to dwindle down to some 2000–3000 valuers nationwide (across all the specialisms mentioned), i.e. decimating some 80% of the current Valuer SRO's membership, due to the complexity of the certification exams.

=== Hong Kong ===
The Hong Kong Institute of Surveyors (HKIS) regulates property surveyors in Hong Kong. Established in 1984, Institute is the only professional organisation representing the surveying profession in Hong Kong. The HKIS was statutorily incorporated by virtue of the Hong Kong Institute of Surveyors Ordinance in January 1990 (Cap. 1148). In July 1991, the Surveyors Registration Ordinance (Cap. 417) was passed to set up a Registration Board to administer the registration of surveyors. In May 2006, the number of members had reached 6,723. A general practice surveyor advises on the best use of the land, assesses the feasibility and viability of the proposed development project as well as the valuation, marketing, sale, leasing and management of completed developments. It also has a website to provide real-time properties' value estimate across whole Hong Kong.

=== Australia ===
The Australian Property Institute (API) was formed in 1926 as the Commonwealth Institute of Valuers. The Institute has undergone several name changes over the last century as the array of services offered by its members expanded. It serves to regulate the profession of property valuers throughout Australia.

Today the API represents the interests of more than 8,600 property professionals throughout Australia. API members include residential, commercial and plant and machinery valuers, property advisers, property analysts, property fund and asset managers, property facility managers, property lawyers and property researchers and academics. The Institute's primary role is to set and maintain the highest standards of professional practice, education, ethics and professional conduct for its members and the broader property profession.

=== New Zealand ===
Real estate valuation in New Zealand is regulated by the New Zealand Institute of Valuers ('NZIV') and the Valuers Registration Board of New Zealand ('VRB'), both of which are statutory bodies established under the Valuers Act 1948 (NZ). The NZIV remains the statutory professional body for valuers in New Zealand, with perpetual succession under the Act. The NZIV can make Rules as lower level legislation and has a Code of Ethics (reviewed in 2023). The NZIV Rules were last changed in 2012 and remain current. The VRB has jurisdiction in relation to serious matters affecting the registration of a valuer including discipline where a valuer has acted in such a way as to meet the threshold. The Valuers Act 1948 sets the threshold under s31 as matters where a valuer could be struck off the register of valuers. The NZIV has power for discipline for relatively more minor matters. The NZIV governs NZIV members and has power to discipline members and fine them up to $500, admonish members or terminate their membership. The designations "Registered Valuer" and "Public Valuer" are legally protected under the legislation, being reserved for Valuers Registered under the Act. The NZIV, under the Act, can admit non-valuer members (such as non-valuer land economists).

There are also voluntary professional bodies for real estate valuation such as the Royal Institute of Chartered Surveyors (RICS) and the Property Institute of New Zealand (PINZ). Both of these bodies have a wider membership, beyond real estate valuers. PINZ has around 1,700 members in New Zealand and overseas (such as ex-pats in the UK, Asia and Australia). PINZ has a service level agreement with the NZIV, whereby PINZ contracts to perform tasks for the statutory professional body, NZIV. PINZ was formed in 2000 to act as the voice of the property professions. There have been 'political divisions' within the valuation profession in New Zealand, expressed at AGMs and through 'proxy wars' over the last 20 years or so. Many valuers are supportive of amalgamation of the NZIV functions under the multi-disciplinary voluntary body PINZ, whilst many others wish to retain a separate statutory professional body for valuers (the NZIV). There are various reasons in the debate and the governing legislation is under review and amendments or repeal is being considered. At present, the Act remains in force and the NZIV is legally a distinct body with statutory functions, powers and duties.

PINZ incorporated much of the membership of the NZIV, the Institute of Plant & Machinery Valuers (IPMV) and the Property & Land Economy Institute of New Zealand (PLEINZ). PINZ now represents the interests of valuers, property and facilities managers, property advisors and plant and machinery valuers. PINZ has developed into one of the largest professional bodies for standards, qualifications and ethics across all facets of the property profession within New Zealand. It works with government, industry and other professional associations, education stakeholders and the media to promote its standards and views.

In New Zealand, the terms "valuation" and "valuer" usually relates to one who undertakes that professional role in terms of the Valuer Act 1948 requirements or the unregulated or voluntarily self-regulated (if members of PINZ) plant and machinery, marine or art valuers. Whereas, the term "appraisal" is usually related to an estimate by a real estate sales person or licensed agent under the Real Estate Agents Act 2008. The Real Estate Institute of New Zealand includes many valuer members, but the governing legislation for sales and agency (disposal of interests of land on behalf of others) does not extend to include provision for that role by valuers regardless of membership of NZIV, RICS or PINZ.

There exists a significant difference in the responsibilities of a real estate agent and a valuer. While a real estate agent is allowed to represent the interests of their client, a valuer is required to offer an unbiased and independent assessment of value. The legal framework governing these roles is distinct as well. Lawyers, Conveyancers, and Real Estate Agents operate under legislation separate from that which regulates valuers. Specifically, the legal provision outlining the responsibilities of Lawyers and Conveyancers is the Lawyers and Conveyancers Act of 2006..

The number of Registered Valuers in New Zealand has generally between 1,000 - 1,300. This is an ageing 'top heavy' professional with difficulty retaining new and young members due to pay, work stress and the recent advent of 'clearing houses' for banks to order valuations for mortgage purposes. The clearing houses have largely ended the long-standing local practice of members of the public seeking advice directly from a valuer. The use of electronic estimates based on Rating Values (Local Government mass appraisal for levies) is also leading to a reduction in standard valuation work and is significantly affecting the viability of small valuation businesses. The profession is in the process of a wider corporate re-structuring of the valuation market due to these factors with various perceptions within profession as to the merits of the events of the last five years.

== See also ==
- American Measurement Standard
- Auditing Standards Board
- Building inspection
- Climate appraisal
- Conveyancing
- German income approach
- Home inspection
- Housing affordability index
- International Property Measurement Standards
- Investment rating for real estate
- Kriging
- Land value tax
- Index of real estate articles
- PLVI (Peak land value intersection)
- Royal Institution of Chartered Surveyors
- Verification and validation
- Real estate
- Real estate business
- Real-estate bubble
