= William N. Kinnard =

American economist and academic (1926–2001)

William N. Kinnard, Jr. (September 12, 1926 – April 6, 2001) was an American economist and real estate investor. He was one of America's leading real estate educators, authors, and experts in the field of appraisal.

== Early life and education ==
Kinnard received a bachelor's degree with honors in economics from Swarthmore College, a Master of Business Administration (M.B.A.) in finance from the Wharton School and, later, earned a Ph.D. in economics from the University of Pennsylvania. He taught at Wesleyan University before becoming director of Urban Redevelopment for the City of Middletown.

== Career ==
Kinnard was an emeritus professor of finance and real estate at the University of Connecticut. He joined the faculty there in 1955, eventually chairing the Finance Department and serving as Associate Dean and Acting Dean before retiring in 1981. He was also the Director of the Institute of Urban Research and the Founding Director of the Center for Real Estate and Urban Economics. A real estate scholarship and a Professorship in Real Estate and Finance are sponsored at UConn in his name. He also taught as a visiting professor at the University of Florida, UCLA, and Brown.

Kinnard was a president of the American Real Estate and Urban Economics Association and the founder of the Real Estate Counseling Group of America. The Appraisal Institute annually gives the Kinnard Award in his honor to the leading real estate appraisal educator in the U.S. After his death, the American Real Estate Society and the Appraisal Institute co-published the text Essays in Honor of William N. Kinnard, Jr. as a memorial. Contributing editors and authors constitute a cross-section of the leading real estate appraisal experts in the world.

He was widely regarded as one of the leading authors, lecturers, and experts on the topic of real estate valuation. His text, Income Property Valuation, published in 1971, is still considered a classic in the field. Altogether, he authored or co-authored thirty-five texts and manuals and innumerable refereed journal articles, manuscripts, and essays starting in 1956 and continuing actively until his death in 2001.

Kinnard was awarded professional designations from the Society of Real Estate Appraisers, the American Institute of Real Estate Appraisers, the American Society of Appraisers, the Institute of Property Taxation, the American Institute of Corporate Asset Management, and the National Association of Realtors. He was inducted into Beta Gamma Sigma, Pi Gamma Mu, and Phi Kappa Phi honor societies. He was awarded the Armstrong/Kahn Award from the Appraisal Journal in 1999 and the James A. Graaskamp Award from the American Real Estate Society in 1995, among numerous other honors. He was a Fellow of the Homer Hoyt Institute.
