= Neil Crosby =

Neil Crosby is an academic valuer, Professor of Real Estate at the University of Reading.

He has been instrumental in changing property valuation practices in the United Kingdom through a series of journal publications in the late 1980s and early 1990s, which dealt with questions of investment property valuation methodology, and through an influential book (Property Investment Appraisal, co-authored with Andrew Baum and now nearing its third edition). The RICS adopted the 'Short-cut DCF' method (a.k.a. the 'Real-value' method) proposed by Crosby, in the 1997 Valuation Information Paper: Commercial Investment Property - Valuation Methods.

In 2002, he was awarded the International Real Estate Society's annual achievement award for his work in real estate research, education and practice.

== See also ==
- Income approach
