= Transactional Asset Pricing Approach =

In the valuation theory department of economics, the Transactional Asset Pricing Approach (TAPA) is a general reconstruction of asset pricing theory developed in 2000s by a collaboration of Russian and Israeli economists Vladimir B. Michaletz and Andrey I. Artemenkov. It provides a basis for reconstructing the discounted cash flow (DCF) analysis and the resulting income capitalization techniques, such as the Gordon growth formula (see dividend discount model ), from a transactional perspective relying, in the process, on a formulated dynamic principle of transactional equity-in-exchange.

== General overview ==
TAPA approach originates with the framing of the dynamic inter-temporal principle of transactional equity-in-exchange for buyers and sellers in an asset transaction, the essence of which is that by the end of the analysis projection period $n$ neither party should be a losing side to the transaction, meaning that the capital of the buyer and the seller bound up in the transaction should be mutually equal at the end of Period $n$. In TAPA, this dynamic valuation predicate forms an underlying new basis for justifying DCF analyses distinct, on the one hand, from the specific-individual-investor DCF premise developed by the American Economist Irving Fisher in his Theory of Interest 1930 book and the perfect-competitive-market-approach to justifying DCF, developed by Merton Miller and Franco Modigliani in their seminal Dividend policy and growth Paper, on the other hand.

Since the Transactional approach to asset valuation, whose genesis can be traced back to Book V of Nicomachean Ethics, implies a distinct accounting for economic interests of both parties to a transaction with an economic asset, the buyer and the seller, it proceeds from developing a dual rate asset pricing model, which is complemented by a deductive-style multi-period discount rate derivation theory, originating as a generalization of the single-period discount rate framework of Burr-Williams, where the single-period discount rate, r, is conceptualized as being constituted of the current income $R$ component and the capital value appreciation $v$ component for a single asset or a portfolio aggregate: $r=R+v$. The multi-period discount rate evaluation theory within TAPA, on the other hand, is a portfolio-level theory, in that it applies to an investment aggregate. A general formula for evaluating discount rates/rates of return at a portfolio-level in TAPA looks as follows
$$\text{TAPA formula for evaluating discount rates,  for period i, in multi-period time-variant discount rate setting: }r(i)= \frac{R\prod_{j = 1}^i (1+u(j))}{\prod_{j=1}^{i-1} (1+v(j))}+ v(i)$$
, where $R=\frac{\quad \sum_{s=1}^n NOI_s}{\quad\sum_{s=1}^n PV_s}$ is a portfolio-level current return component (yield) for Period 1 of the selected projection period (it is assumed the portfolio is made up of $1..s$ assets, each yielding net operating income $NOI_s$ by the end of Analysis Period 1 over the asset $s$ capital value $PV_s$ as at the beginning of Period 1);$u(j)$ - is the expected rate of change in the aggregate net operating incomes $NOI_s$ of the assets making up the portfolio during the period $j$ (subsequent to Period 1 ) ; in a similar vein, $v(i), v(j)$ is the expected capital value appreciation rate (growth rate) at the market/portfolio level during periods $i, j$, respectively. Unlike the Capital asset pricing model(CAPM) which is built in the two-coordinates plane ("standard deviation(risk) -- expected (mean) return") relevant for pricing liquid securities traded on deep financial markets, the TAPA discount rate model is built in the "income growth-capital value growth" coordinates plane, thus it is relevant for pricing all types of income-producing assets, such as property, not just the liquid securities.

Unlike single-period CAPM, TAPA is an explicit multi-period framework for forecasting market (or specific portfolio) rates of return.

The TAPA theory lists conditions under which the developed dual-rate general asset pricing model reduces to the conventional single-rate Discounted cash flow (DCF) analyses framework. Such a framework with time-variable discount rates is called the TAPA BPE (Basic Pricing Equation):
$$\text{TAPA's Basic Pricing Equation (BPE), with time-variable discount rates: } PV(0)= NOI \cdot\sum_{k=1}^n\frac{\quad\prod_{i=2}^k (1+u_o(i))}{\quad\prod_{i=1}^k(1+r(i))} + PV(0) \frac{\quad\prod_{i=1}^n (1+v_o(i))}{\quad\prod_{i=1}^n (1+r(i))}$$
where, $PV(0)$ stands for the market value of the asset being valued as at the valuation date ($t=0$) determined under the Income approach; $r(i)$-is the time-variable discount rate determined under the TAPA multi-period discount rate forecasting framework above; $v_0(i)$ - is the expected rate of change in the capital value $PV(i-1)$ of the asset being valued (subject asset) over the period $i ,(i=1..n)$; $u_o(i)$ -is the expected rate of change in the net operating income from the subject asset $NOI(i-1)$ over period $i$. ($NOI =NOI(1)$). The first term in the TAPA BPE formula above stands for the discounted (present) value of subject asset's benefits represented by the $NOI$ series; while the second term—represents the residual (reversionary) value of the subject asset at the end of the projection/holding period $n$, proportioned, via the imputation of $v_O(i)$ terms, to the asset's present value $PV(0)$ sought at the beginning of the projection period. Thus, as can be seen, TAPA's BPE equation of value is a circular equation usually solvable by numeric methods of evaluation. The distinction of $v_o(i), u_o(i)$ vis-a-vis $v(i), u(i)$ variables is emphasized in TAPA. The former represent the properties of the subject asset being valued, the latter - the properties of a benchmark (a market aggregate or a portfolio) against which the valuation of subject asset is rendered. The discount rate $r(i)$, being based on $v(i)$ and $u(i)$ variables specific to the benchmark portfolio, therefore represents the dynamic (expected performance) properties of the benchmark, not any of the properties of the subject asset being valued. Such a conceptualization of discount rates in the TAPA context emphasizes the explicit comparative nature of any income-approach-based valuation, with TAPA making such a linkage to a valuation benchmark employed explicit via the specification of discount rates in the multi-period analysis framework that it offers.

The TAPA theory provides original derivations and conditions under which such BPE can be further reduced to most of the known income capitalization formats within the valuation theory, such as the direct income capitalization format (DIC), The Gordon Growth Model, the Inwood and Hoskald capitalization formats. One novel income capitalization format obtainable from the TAPA BPE is known as the "Quick capitalization model"

== Dual-rate asset pricing model in TAPA ==
Dual-rate asset pricing model developed under TAPA represents a substantial contribution of TAPA to generalizing the Discounted cash flow analysis framework. The General pricing equation for this model is as follows:
$$\text{TAPA dual rate asset pricing model: } PV(0)\cdot\prod_{i=1}^n (1+r^s(i)) = z \left [ \sum_{k=1}^{n-1} {NOI_k \cdot \prod_{i=k+1}^n (1+r^b(i))} +NOI_n +S_{res} \right]$$
where, additionally, $r^b(i)$ and $r^s(i)$ stand for the expected rates-of-return/discount rates utilized by the buyer (b) and seller (s) with reference to Period $i$, respectively, for the purposes of subject asset transactional pricing (hence, the "dual-rate" model); $S_{res}$ - is the expected residual (reversionary) value of the subject asset at the end of its holding period $n$; $z$- is an imputed measure of dis-proportionality between the economic interests of the buyer and the seller, with the left-hand-side of the Equation reflecting economic interests of the seller, and the Right-hand side—those of the buyer. If the residual value of the subject asset $S_{res}$ can be assumed to be proportioned to the asset's initial value sought $PV(0)$ via an imputation of the asset's own rates of change in capital value expected over the projection period, $v_o(i)$, like it is assumed in the TAPA BPE context, then the presented dual-rate pricing equation becomes amenable to solutions for $PV(0)$ e.g. by numerical methods.

The dynamic principle of equity-in-exchange mentioned above implies $z=1$; this principle is needed to reduce the dual-rate pricing model to more conventional-looking DCF analyses and TAPA BPE shown above, along with the assumption that $r^b(i)=r^s(i)=r(i)$, i.e. that the buyer's and seller's rates of return converge to some representative market value for such rates,$r(i)$, called "the discount rate" in the conventional single-rate DCF applications; as mentioned, TAPA's multi-period discount rate evaluation framework summarized in the formula above allows to determine such converged market rates on a valuation benchmark (portfolio) level.

== Applications ==
TAPA valuation framework is applicable to pricing assets possessing less than perfect liquidity with reference to a selected valuation benchmark for which the discount rates have to be developed, or forecast, by a valuer. In particular, the TAPA approach has found applications for pricing assets to the Equitable/Fair standard of value (valuation basis), which is defined in the International Valuation Standards published by the International Valuation Standards Council. Additionally, the flexible time-variable nature of discount rates in the TAPA BPE provides a novel framework for exploring the effects of market cycles on the prices of assets embedded in the markets
