= Real Estate Counseling Group of America =

American real estate valuation expert group

- Abbreviation: RECGA
- Formation: 1970; 56 years ago
- Founder: William N. Kinnard
- Type: Expert group
- Purpose: Bring together a group of real estate valuation experts
- Region served: United States
- Members: 30 (2025)
- Website: recga.net

The Real Estate Counseling Group of America (RECGA) is an American group of recognized experts, each a principal in a firm that provides real estate valuations or similar, that provides a wide variety of professional expertise and resource skills to the industry in the United States. The organization limits itself to 30 active members at any one time.

== History ==
The Group was founded in 1970 by William N. Kinnard, a former president of the American Real Estate and Urban Economics Association, who sought to bring together a small group of top U.S. real estate appraisal and consulting experts to meet regularly, consult with each other on complex topics, and serve as co-authors and co-references for a growing body of complex valuation literature.

Since its founding, it has counted among its membership many of the presidents of the Appraisal Institute, editors of numerous journals (e.g. The Appraisal Journal and the Journal of Real Estate Research), heads of important institutes (e.g. the Weimer School, the Homer Hoyt Institute), and the authors of nearly three dozen books on real estate appraisal and analytical methods.
