= Bowfinger =

1999 film by Frank Oz

- Theatrical release poster
- Directed by: Frank Oz
- Written by: Steve Martin
- Produced by: Brian Grazer
- Starring: Steve Martin; Eddie Murphy; Heather Graham; Christine Baranski; Terence Stamp
- Cinematography: Ueli Steiger
- Edited by: Richard Pearson
- Music by: David Newman
- Production company: Imagine Entertainment
- Distributed by: Universal Pictures
- Release date: August 13, 1999 (U.S.)
- Running time: 97 minutes
- Country: United States
- Language: English
- Budget: $55 million
- Box office: $98.6 million

Bowfinger is a 1999 American satirical comedy film directed by Frank Oz. The film depicts a down-and-out filmmaker in Hollywood attempting to make a film on a small budget with a star who does not know that he is in the movie. It was written by Steve Martin, who also stars alongside Eddie Murphy in two roles, and also features Heather Graham as an ambitious would-be starlet.

Bowfinger was released in the United States by Universal Pictures on August 13, 1999, to positive reviews, and grossed $98.6 million against a $55 million budget. The film is considered by many as one of Murphy's best and most underappreciated films.

== Plot ==
B movie film producer Robert "Bobby" Bowfinger has been saving up to direct a movie since he was ten years old: he now has $2,184 to pay for production costs. He has a script called "Chubby Rain" penned by an accountant, Afrim, and a camera operator, Dave, who has access to studio equipment through his job as a gofer. Bowfinger then lines up several actors who are hungry for work, along with a crowd of illegal Mexican immigrants as his camera crew; the only other thing he needs is a studio deal in order to distribute his masterwork.

He extracts a promise from high-ranking Universal Pictures executive Jerry Renfro that Universal will distribute the film if it includes currently hot action star Kit Ramsey. Ramsey – a pompous, neurotic, and paranoid actor – refuses, so Bowfinger concocts a plan to covertly film all of Ramsey's scenes without his knowledge. The actors, told that Ramsey is method acting and will not be interacting with them outside of their scenes, walk up to Ramsey in public and recite their lines while hidden cameras catch Ramsey's confused reactions.

The plan goes well at first: Ramsey (who is a member of a Scientology-like organization called MindHead) swallows the movie's alien invasion premise and believes he is genuinely being stalked by aliens, resulting in an exceptionally genuine and intense performance. However, the strain on his already-precarious mental state leads him to go into hiding in order to maintain his sanity, stalling the film's production.

Bowfinger resorts to hiring a Ramsey lookalike named Jiff. Jiff is unassuming, amiable, and so naïve that Bowfinger is able to persuade him to run across a busy freeway for a scene by assuring him the speeding cars are all being driven by "stunt drivers". During a chat with the other cast members, Jiff reveals that he is Kit's twin brother, explaining the likeness. Using this new knowledge, Bowfinger tasks Jiff with finding out Kit's location and plans so they can ambush him and film the final scene.

Only one scene remains to be shot: the finale set at the Griffith Observatory. Though otherwise pleased with Kit's unscripted dialogue, Bowfinger considers his character's final line "Gotcha, suckas!" to be the key moment of the film. Bowfinger directs Daisy, the female lead, to guide Kit through the scene under the guise of showing him how to get rid of the "aliens". During the filming, Kit becomes terrified and struggles to deliver the final line. At this point, Kit's MindHead mentor, Terry Stricter, who has discovered evidence that Kit's "aliens" may not be just in his head, shows up at the observatory and shuts down production, invoking the illegality of filming Kit without his knowledge.

Bowfinger's camera crew show him B-roll footage of Kit Ramsey they were filming off-set, just in case they caught anything they could use. The footage shows Kit donning a paper bag over his head and exposing himself to the Laker Girl Cheerleading Squad, something Terry Stricter previously dissuaded him from doing. Bowfinger blackmails Stricter and the MindHead leadership with the footage, threatening to release it and ruin Ramsey's career (which would impact MindHead's finances as Ramsey is a major donor). Stricter acquiesces and Bowfinger finishes the film with Kit's cooperation, and the cast and crew finally get to attend the film's premiere where they are awed by the result. Following the apparent success of the film, Bowfinger receives an offer to direct a martial arts film in Taiwan starring Jiff. An elaborate fight scene from the new movie, Fake Purse Ninjas, is seen, featuring everyone who worked on Chubby Rain.

== Cast ==
- Steve Martin as Robert "Bobby" Bowfinger
- Eddie Murphy as Kit Ramsey/Jiffrenson "Jiff" Ramsey
- Heather Graham as Daisy
- Christine Baranski as Carol
- Terence Stamp as Terry Stricter
- Robert Downey Jr. as Jerry Renfro
- Jamie Kennedy as Dave
- Adam Alexi-Malle as Afrim
- Kohl Sudduth as Slater
- Barry Newman as Hal, Kit's agent
- Alejandro Patiño as Sanchez
- Alfred De Contreras as Martinez
- Ramiro Fabian as Hector
- John Cho as Nightclub cleaner
- Phill Lewis as Auditioning actor
- Marisol Nichols as Auditioning actress

== Production ==
The film was produced by Brian Grazer's company Imagine Entertainment, in conjunction with Universal Studios. The working title for the film was Bowfinger's Big Thing.

The film's costs amounted to US$44 million.

=== Casting ===
Writer/co-star Steve Martin originally wrote the role of Kit Ramsey with an actor such as Keanu Reeves in mind, but Grazer suggested Eddie Murphy instead and Martin approved.

Heather Graham described her character Daisy in an interview with CNN's Entertainment News; "I'm this naive, innocent girl who wants to be an actress. I'm willing to stop at nothing." Graham stated that she has a "special attachment" to the roles she chooses, and explained, "I think it's kind of like you fall in love with the person, like you fall in love with the script."

=== Post-production ===
The executives at Universal wanted to cut the freeway scene because they felt it would be too expensive; Martin replied he would not cut the funniest scene in the film.

== Themes ==
The film spoofs the cult of celebrity and experiences film producers can undergo when attempting to get a movie made in Hollywood. Time Out Film Guide called the film a "satire on Hollywood's lunatic fringe." The Seattle Post-Intelligencer noted that "it takes swipes at stupid action films" and "the ageism of the industry." The Seattle Post-Intelligencer also noted Eddie Murphy's ability to spoof himself in the film, including "kidding his own legendary paranoia, evoking his real-life sex scandal and allowing himself to be the butt of Martin's extended gag." Leonard Schwarz of Palo Alto Online described the film as "arch and knowing about the ways of Hollywood", including "producers who want to keep their cars more than their kids when they get divorced." Russell Smith of The Austin Chronicle noted the film's satire of "L.A. movie culture, and brain-dead blockbuster films." An article in the San Francisco Chronicle by Bob Graham wrote that "Martin the writer plants some wicked barbs in Hollywood's rear end about creative financing of movies and hoarding of profits, the art of the deal, hipper-than-thou attitudes and exploitation." Laurie Scheer wrote in Creative Careers in Hollywood: "Steve Martin's performance as Bobby Bowfinger is one that is not to be missed, especially if you are choosing a career as a producer."

Themes within the film have been compared to Mel Brooks' The Producers; a critique in the Denver Rocky Mountain News wrote that the film has "...the madcap velocity of Mel Brooks' The Producers." Roger Ebert wrote that "Like Mel Brooks' The Producers, it's about fringe players who strike out boldly for the big time." Janet Maslin of The New York Times wrote, "The title character in the hilarious, good-hearted Bowfinger is a tireless schemer who, like Zero Mostel in The Producers, is part of a great show-biz tradition: being ruthless, delusional and hellbent on turning lemons into lemonade." Jeff Millar of the Houston Chronicle compared Steve Martin's character in the film to Ed Wood, and Kenneth Turan of the Los Angeles Times described Bowfinger International Pictures as "a company so threadbare even schlockmeister Ed Wood would've looked down on it." Comparisons were also made to Tim Burton's eponymous film about the director, Ed Wood.

The fictional organization "MindHead" has been compared by film critics to the Church of Scientology. Paul Clinton wrote in CNN online: "Bowfinger could just be viewed as an out-there, over-the-top spoof about Hollywood, films, celebrities and even the Church of Scientology. But Martin has written a sweet story about a group of outsiders with impossible dreams." Andrew O'Hehir wrote in Salon that "Too much of 'Bowfinger' involves the filmmakers' generically wacky pursuit of the increasingly paranoid Kit, who flees into the clutches of a pseudo-Scientology outfit called MindHead (their slogan: 'Truth Through Strength')." The Denver Post, the Daily Record, and the San Francisco Chronicle made similar comparisons, and the Albuquerque Journal and the Fort Worth Star-Telegram called MindHead a "thinly veiled" parody of Scientology. A review in The New York Times described actor Terence Stamp's role in the film as "a cult leader for a Scientology-like organization called Mind Head", and The Dallas Morning News and the Houston Chronicle made similar statements about Stamp's character. Writer Steve Martin told the New York Daily News, "I view it as a pastiche of things I've seen come and go through the years", and stated "Scientology gets a lot of credit or blame right now, because they're the hottest one." The Cincinnati Enquirer noted in its review "For the record, Mr. Martin denies MindHead is based on Scientology."

== Release ==
The film was initially scheduled for a July 30, 1999, release, but in May, Universal pushed its release back to August 27. Its final release date was August 13, 1999.

== Reception ==
=== Critical response ===
On Rotten Tomatoes, Bowfinger holds an approval rating of 81% based on 113 reviews, with an average rating of 7/10. The website's critical consensus reads: "A witty commentary on modern film-making, with enough jokes to keep it entertaining throughout." At Metacritic, the film has a weighted average score of 71 out of 100, based on 33 critics, indicating "generally favorable" reviews. Audiences polled by CinemaScore gave the film an average grade of "B−" on an A+ to F scale.

Roger Ebert gave the film three and a half out of four stars, and wrote "Bowfinger is one of those comedies where everything works." The film received three out of four stars from the TLA Video & DVD Guide, where it was described as a "goodspirited, funny look at a hack Hollywood producer who will go to any lengths to get his film made." The Seattle Post-Intelligencer gave the film a rating of "A−" in its review, writing "This is one terrific comedy that doesn't let up for an instant." The Rocky Mountain News highlighted the film as a "Critics' Choice", and wrote that "Steve Martin takes gentle but funny aim at Hollywood" in the film. In The Washington Post, Jane Horwitz described the film as a "riotous farce". The Kansas City Star called it a "frequently hilarious comedy". The New York Times' Janet Maslin wrote, "This hilarious, good-hearted spiritual descendant of The Producers is a comic coup for Mr. Martin."

A review in the Deseret Morning News was critical, giving the film two and a half out of four stars, and called it a "funny but frantic and somewhat mean-spirited comedy." Film critic Russell Smith of The Austin Chronicle gave the film two and a half stars, and wrote, "As a diehard Martin fan, I'm still hoping for a comeback, but it'll take better efforts than this to get me back in his cheering section." Leonard Maltin also gave the film two and a half stars, and wrote in his Leonard Maltin's Movie Guide: "Likeable costars carry this comedy a long way; there are some good laughs throughout, but it's never as satisfying as you'd like it to be."

Stacey Wilson Hunt of Vulture considered Bowfinger as Murphy's underrated classic. In an interview with Hunt, Murphy said: "I love Bowfinger. That's a funny one. It was all mostly on page—I don't remember doing a lot of improvising. I kind of played what he wanted to play. It was all Steve Martin's creation."

=== Box office ===
Bowfinger debuted at the #2 spot behind The Sixth Sense, with an initial box office weekend return of US$18.2 million at 2,700 theaters in the United States. It held onto the number two spot in its second week, earning an additional $10.7 million and grossing $35.7 million within its first ten days. As of September 7, 1999, Bowfinger was at the fourth spot, with a weekend return of $7 million and a total gross of $55.5 million. By September 13, 1999, the film had slipped to 5th place, with a weekend return of $3.7 million, for a total take of $60.5 million. By October 11, 1999, the film had earned $65 million in the United States. The film did not fare as well overseas as it did in the United States.

== Soundtrack ==
Bowfinger: Original Motion Picture Soundtrack

Soundtrack album by Various artists
- Released: August 10, 1999
- Recorded: January—June 1999
- Label: Varèse Sarabande

1. "There is Always One More Time" - Johnny Adams
2. "You're a Wonderful One" - Marvin Gaye
3. "And I Love You So" - Perry Como
4. "Mambo U.K." - Cubanismo
5. "Super Bad, Super Slick" - James Brown
6. "Secret Agent Man" - Johnny Rivers
7. "Betsy Chases Kit/The First Shot/A Short Ride/Dave Makes a Call/Dave Returns Camera"
8. "Cafe Set-Up/Shooting the Cafe/Stealing Renfro's Car/Auditioning the Butts"
9. "Chubby Rain"
10. "Clothing Store/Daisy Rescues Kit"
11. "The Observatory"
12. "Finale/Fed Ex Delivers"

== See also ==
- List of films featuring fictional films
