= Geographical segregation =

Sociological term

Geographical segregation exists whenever the proportions of population rates of two or more populations are not homogeneous throughout a defined space. Populations can be considered any plant or animal species, human genders, followers of a certain religion, people of different nationalities, ethnic groups, etc.

In social geography segregation of ethnic groups, social classes and genders is often measured by the calculation of indices such as the index of dissimilarity. Different dimensions of segregation (or its contrary) are recognized: exposure, evenness, clustering, concentration, centralization, etc. More recent studies also highlight new local indices of segregation.

Geographical segregation is most often measured with individuals' place of residence, but increasing geographical data availability makes it now possible to compute segregation indexes using individuals' activity space, in whole or in part.

== Human geographical segregation ==
Segregation, as a broad concept, has appeared in all parts of the world where people exist—in different contexts and times it takes on different forms, shaped by the physical and human environments. The spatial concentration of population groups is not a new phenomenon. Since societies began to form there have been segregated inhabitants. Either segregated purposefully by force, or gradually over time, segregation was based on socio-economic, religious, educational, linguistic or ethnic grounds. Some groups choose to be segregated to strengthen social identity.

== Types ==
=== Legal segregation ===
Segregation can be caused by legal frameworks, such as in the extreme example of apartheid in South Africa, and even Jewish ghettoization in Germany in the 20th century. Segregation can also happen slowly, stimulated by increased land and housing prices in certain neighborhoods, resulting in segregation of rich and poor in many urban cities. Segregation can also be assigned arbitrarily. This can occur on a global scale, such as is seen in the Partition of India, instances in Ireland, and many other situations. Geographical boundaries were often put in place without much consideration for native peoples and natural geographic terrain and cultural limits that had long been in place.

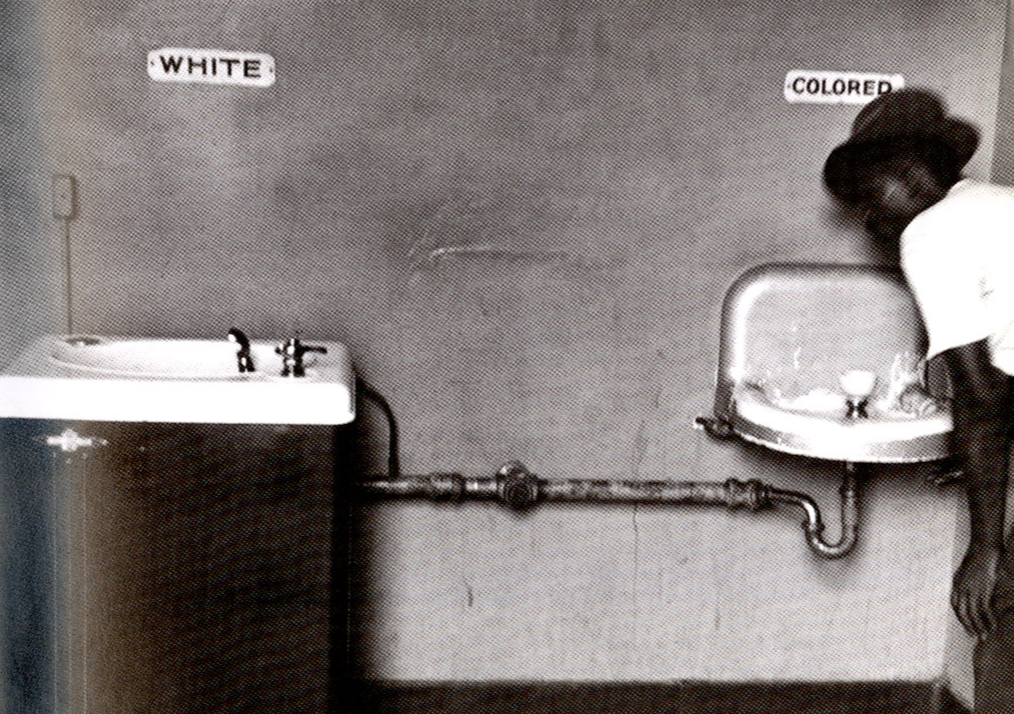
Image of segregated water fountain during the Jim Crow era in the American South.

In the United States, segregation was enforced through the law. Notably, the racial segregation between white and black racial populations in the American South during the late 1800s into the first half of the 20th century. These laws consisted of separating people of color from white people in public places, including movie theaters, restaurants, schools, shopping centers, etc. The legislations were commonly referred to as Jim Crow laws. Although these laws were abolished in the mid 1960’s the impacts are still present in American communities today. Represented through the significant gap in homeownership, income status, and education levels in communities of color versus majority white.

In apartheid South Africa, segregation was very much a legal concept. Enforced by the government, black and South-Africans of color were discriminated against, and forced to comply with apartheid. Some of the legislation passed dealt with physical segregation in schools, land tenure, geographic segregation and state repression. These were very clearly legislative, but also in the case of most white South Africans, a social construct as well.

Segregation can also be encouraged, using geographical boundaries, while not explicitly enforced. Public housing projects, especially in the United States, have been criticized for this. Putting cheap housing in poor black neighborhoods encouraged local African-Americans to stay in the area, keeping other richer areas white by not building public housing there. Current day, many communities within the United States are still segregated, due to the ongoing racial inequalities still present and self-segregation.

=== Social segregation and gentrification ===
Segregation can also be caused by social factors that become evident as they happen, but are not necessarily government sanctioned. This could be things like informal ghettos, or simply rich neighborhoods. In terms of land capital, over time in a given area, humans will settle down and buy or take land. Some privileged people will acquire better land (that is, more arable, proximate to potential capital, more pleasing views). Demand for these nicer habitats drives up prices, and areas deemed "better" based solely on geography become inherently exclusionary in their population makeup.

West Point Grey, an area of Vancouver Canada, is in part rich because of the views offered of Downtown Vancouver, the Gulf Islands, and its location near the water and University of British Columbia. Wealthy people had the resources to pay for advantages, and subsequently drove up prices. Examples of this can be seen all over the world. Geographical segregation is not always defined by the sightline of places. It also occurs around certain structures, or simply in areas that are specifically developed with an income bracket in mind.

These social factors are commonly attributed to the impacts of gentrification. Gentrification is the process in which the makeup of a community is changed. These changes include racial identity, economic status, and level of education. Generally, gentrification occurs in communities that are low-income and a majority-minority population. It begins when affluent families, usually of white racial identity, move into these lower-income neighborhoods and invest their money into the community. These improvements to the community consist of reconstructing public transit, the businesses within downtown areas, and the houses in neighborhoods. This raises the overall investment value of the area, which increases the living costs. Which in turn, causes the original low-income residents to be displaced, due to the unaffordability. It can also create physical health issues for the original residents. As they are segregated in areas typically near factors or construction zones, exposing them to toxins. The Center for Disease Control and Prevention has issued that gentrification is a public health issue.

Another segregation term, the ghetto, has been used in many different contexts over time, generally meaning any physical part of a city predominantly occupied by any particular group of people. It implies that the group may be looked down upon and segregated purposefully. This does not mean that all ghettos are built up communities and buildings specifically for a segregation purpose, although many are. In the case of the United States, segregation of the African-American community was to a degree due to white flight out of the cities, rather than forcing African-Americans to live in the downtown cores.

=== Gated communities ===
Gated communities could be seen as a combination of both legal frameworks and social conventions regarding segregation. A gated community today is a controlled neighborhood, inhabited by people with common interests, such as safety, or class separation, but not necessarily of the same ethnicity or religion—it is distinct from an international community (in most cases). Gated communities are very controversial, as they can be seen as encouraging distinction and separation, and therefore superiority from those who do not live with the gates community.

=== Self-segregation ===
Self segregation is almost as common an occurrence as involuntary segregation is. Often, immigrants coming to a new and foreign country will band together for mutual benefit, and to keep a sense of community in the new country. These can be called ethnic enclaves and can be formed by any community or people group. Some well-known groups are Chinatowns, Little Italys and barrios. These localized phenomena also come in the form of ethnoburbs, which are essentially the same concept as an ethnic enclave, but specifically located in suburbs, rather than the traditional downtowns, where Chinatowns and Little Italys are usually based.
