= German income approach =

German standard approach to property valuing

The German income approach (German: Ertragswertverfahren, abbr. EWV) is the standard income approach used in Germany for the valuing of property that produces a stream of future cash flows.

== Basic principles and regulations ==
The EWV is one of three valuation methods codified by German legislation. The Vergleichswertverfahren (sales comparable approach) is mainly used to determine the value of owner-occupied buildings (single-family houses, condominiums) and land. The Sachwertverfahren (cost approach) is only used for special use properties that do not produce a measurable future cash flow. Subsequently, the EWV is used for the vast majority of appraisals.

Even though the EWV is mostly consistent with international practice, there are some important differences:

- Land and improvements are treated separately. German Generally Accepted Valuation Principles (GAVP) assumes that the land can be used indefinitely, but that buildings have a limited lifespan; This coincides with the balancing of the assets. The value of the land is determined by the sales comparison approach in both the income and cost approaches, using the data accumulated by the Gutachterausschuss (local valuation committees, lit. "expert committees") which is then added to the building value.
- In order to account for the usage of the land by the buildings occupying it, the net operating income is reduced by the Liegenschaftszins (interest paid to the land-owner by the owner of the building, i.e. ground rent). The Liegenschaftszins is the product of the land value and the Liegenschaftszinssatz (interest rate for land-use). The Liegenschaftszinssatz is the equivalent of the yield − with some important differences − and is determined by the Gutachterausschuss.
- Unlike the All Risks Yield (ARY) in UK practice, the Liegenschaftszinssatz (LZ) does not include an allowance for default (not to be confused with structural vacancy), and therefore this should be subtracted from gross operating income. As a result, the Liegenschaftszinssatz will usually be lower than the All Risks Yield.
- Based on the assumption that the economic life of the improvements is limited, the yield and remaining economic life determine the building value through the net operating income.
- It should be additionally noted that contracts in Germany generally prescribe that the landlord bears a higher portion of maintenance and operating costs than their counterparts in the US and UK.

Real estate appraisal in Germany is regulated by the federal Baugesetzbuch (abbr. BauGB, the German statutory code of building and construction). This federal law is supported by the Wertermittlungsverordnung (abbr. WertV, "regulation on the determination of value"). The WertV defines the codified valuation approaches and the general valuation technique. WertV's general regulations are further supported by the Wertermittlungsrichtlinie (abbr. WertR, "directive on the determination of value"). The WertR provides templates for calculations, tables (e. g. economic depreciation) and guidelines for the consideration of different influences. WertV and WertR are not binding for appraisals for non-official use, nonetheless they should be regarded as best practice or German Professional Appraisal Practice (PAP).

== Determination of value drivers ==
=== Building condition and useful life ===
The condition of the building has a direct effect on the valuation. First of all it has to be determined whether the building has a maintenance backlog. If so, the cost for resolving this backlog (usually referred to as capex) has to be calculated and will later on be subtracted from the value. This calculation has to be made under the assumption that it correlates with the assumed rental income and also has to take into effect the building's age. Secondly, major refurbishment or upgradings have to be taken into account, as they can extend the duration of the building's useful life.

German literature and the semi-official Normalherstellungskosten 2000 (abbr. NHK 2000, "Normal Production Costs") provide detailed information on the useful life span, which is generally judged to be 60–80 years for multiple dwellings and 50–80 years for office buildings. It must be stressed that the useful life span needs to be applied with due regard to the economic environment, whereas the technical life span may be indefinite. Towards the end of its useful life, the building's value is understood to decrease sharply, as either a new building or a major refurbishment will be necessary to generate rental income in the long run.

Therefore a recent major refurbishment (outer shell, rentable areas, HVACR, etc.) can significantly increase the building's remaining useful life, depending on the scope of the refurbishment and assuming that other considerations such as layout and energy consumption do not confound the effort.

Contaminations of the building with asbestos or other harmful materials might also affect the total value; this is usually accounted for by subtracting the decontamination costs from the building's value.

=== Land value ===
In order to separately determine the value of the land, an appraiser in Germany will usually will use the information gathered by the Gutachterausschuss (GA). Most GAs will publish market reports every two years, including Bodenrichtwertkarten (land value guide maps). It is also possible to directly contact the local GA and ask for land value data on a specific plot of land.

The following must be taken into account when utilising a given comparable:

- The comparable must be nearby or, when referring to a land value zone, the subject of the valuation must be within or nearby the respective zone;
- The type of use (residential, office, retail, industrial, etc.) should be in line with that of the subject of the valuation;
- The degree of utilisation - measured in gross floor area or gross volume area - must be made comparable by use of appropriate conversion coefficients;
- The size of the parcel of land must be taken into account.

Further on the appraiser has to check if there are additional factors that will influence the land value. These might be site development costs, contamination, right-of-way or other rights etc. These have to be taken into account in an appropriate manner.

=== Yield ===
The yield, which in German valuation practice is known as the Liegenschaftszinssatz, is a crucial value driver, as it will be used to determine the Liegenschaftszins (a notional rent subtracted from the building's net operating income in order to account for the usage of the economic good "land"). Moreover, together with the residual life span, it mathematically determines the multiplier that is used to calculate the building's value.

Again, the Gutachterausschüsse will provide information on the yield. By empirical analysis of the purchase price data base, the GA stipulates the local yield by type of use. Alas, a widespread problem is that some GAs in smaller municipalities do not carry out these analyses and thus do not publish yield data. In that case the appraiser has to fall back on a combination of nationwide yield data, market research and experience.

During the past few years, yields for residential assets (multiple dwellings) were usually within the range of four to five percent, depending on local market conditions. Yields for office buildings should mostly be in the range of five to six percent, while yields for retail and logistics buildings will be accordingly higher.

The determined basic yield (for type of usage and municipality) should always be analysed further, as under or above average liquidity, lay of the land or the floor plans, should be taken into account by way of a deduction or premium of 25 or 50 basis points for each respective factor.

=== Gross income ===
Needless to say, the Rohertrag (gross income) is the most important value driver for real estate which produces future cash flows. The EWV is basically a static model, meaning that a sustainable income is treated as stable in the future. The appraiser will form his (or her) opinion on the basis of the existing leases, while also considering the market rent.

In commercial real estate such as office or retail buildings, the existing leases usually determine the sustainable income, as long as the lease contracts are long-term and the tenant has a good credit rating. If this is not the case, then the appraiser must rely on his or her knowledge of the market, as well as his experience regarding future lease contracts. Possible incentives must also be accounted for.

In contrast to commercial real estate, residential lease contracts are highly codified by the Bürgerliches Gesetzbuch (abbr. BGB, "German civil code"). One of the central ideas there regarding real estate, is the Ortsübliche Vergleichsmiete (local customary comparable rent). New leases must not be more than 20 percent (not exactly stated by BGB, depending on the jurisdiction) higher than the local customary comparable rent, or the rental contracts may be nullified. Within existing lease contracts, rent increases (i) must not exceed the local customary comparable rent, (ii) are only allowed for if the rent has not increased for the past 15 months, and (iii) must not exceed a total increase of 20 percent within three years. To conclude, the determination of the sustainable rent for residential assets should be made on conservative premises and in close correlation with the current rents. Experience shows that foreign investors have in the past tended to underestimate the effects of such legislation.

The sustainable rent, determined as described above, will be treated as stable and will form the basis of the irredeemable. However, it is possible to allow for over or under rents in the short run. The difference between this and the sustainable rent should be discounted and the resulting value should be added or subtracted to the building value (this approach is in some ways comparable to the hard core/layer method employed in UK practice).

A special case is the existence of struktureller Leerstand (long-term or structural vacancy) resulting from an imbalance in the market or from unfavourable characteristics of the subject property. If this is the case, determination of the sustainable rent will not assume a fully rented property, but instead will allow for a certain level of permanent vacancy.

Additional income e.g. from mobile phone antennae must also be included in the gross income.

=== Expenses ===
German GAVP (especially the WertV) breaks down the Bewirtschaftungskosten (operating expenses) into four types. It should be observed that contracts in Germany generally prescribe that the landlord bears a higher portion of maintenance and operating costs than their counterparts in the US and UK

- The Heiz-, Betriebs- und Nebenkosten ("cost of heating and running costs"): Depending on the respective lease contracts, in commercial properties all costs can be and usually are passed on to the tenant. This is different in residential assets, because the Betriebskostenverordnung (abbr. BetrKV, "running costs regulation") stipulates which costs can and which costs cannot be passed on. Whereas costs of water, heating, caretaker, etc. can be passed on (energy companies usually bill costs for electricity directly to the tenant), other costs such as property tax and insurance cannot be reimbursed. Therefore in appraisals for residential properties a certain amount (ranging from 20 to 50 Eurocent per square metre per month) should be allowed for.
- The Verwaltungskosten ("administrative costs"): These can be passed on in commercial leases, but not in residential leases. Management costs usually range from two to five percent of the gross income for commercial properties and between 15 and 20 Euro per month per residential unit in residential properties. If the building is held in co-operative ownership, the administrative costs are significantly higher.
- The Instandhaltungskosten (maintenance costs): In commercial leases these can be reimbursed, if the contract is formulated accordingly. Most contracts however leave the costs of maintenance of the outer shell to the owner. With residential real estate the owner has to allow for the maintenance costs. In order to determine the exact numbers, the appraisal should also take into consideration how high the fluctuation is and if cosmetic repairs are agreed upon. Standard projections for maintenance costs vary widely from four to 20 Euro per square meter per year.
- The Mietausfallwagnis (allowance for rental loss): As described in the introduction, in German GAVP a rental loss (income from existing leases that is lost due to poor economic situation of the tenant) is allowed for as an expense. This might look strange in comparison to US or UK practice, but it has the advantage that the loss can be allowed for in quite a precise manner. It is usually calculated on the basis of existing numbers. In well-managed residential properties it should not be higher than two percent, in commercial properties three to four percent (depending on tenant structure).

== Calculation procedures ==
After the determination of the value drivers, the calculation procedure itself is rather simple.

=== Calculation of the value of land ===
The value of the land is calculated by multiplying the land value (after adjustments) with the size of the land. Surplus land has to be looked at separately, as this is a special case. Potential decontamination costs or other effects influencing the value are taken into account by an appropriate premium or deduction.

=== Calculation of the value of the building ===
The Jahresreinertrag ("net annual operating income" (NOI)) is determined by subtracting the yearly expenses from the gross income. In a next step, the notional ground rent is allowed for. This so-called Liegenschaftszins ("rent for land use") is determined by multiplying the land value with the yield (after adjustments). The resulting yearly sum is subtracted from the result of the previous step.

In order to transform the yearly NOI into the building value, the multiplier is mathematically (or by use of tables provided by the WertR) determined from the residual usage period and the yield (after adjustments). The product of the multiplier and the NOI determines the building value.

This building value can be adjusted by premiums or deductions for maintenance backlog, harmful material, over or under rent etc. The resulting figure is the adjusted value of the building.

=== Consolidation ===
The addition of land value and building value (improvements) results in the property value. WertV article 19 offers the possibility of making final adjustments for any circumstances not taken into account in the previous steps. However, any additional adjustments should be explicitly stated.

== Formal aspects ==
A good appraisal report should be transparent and comprehensible. The determination of the value drivers should be well-documented and referenced, so that an expert reader may be able to quickly assess the report's quality.

Most appraisal reports are structured as follows:

- Introduction, date of valuation, customer and purpose of the valuation;
- Documentation of land register and other legal factors;
- Description of land and improvements;
- Analysis of the market situation and rental contracts;
- Documentation of the determination of value drivers;
- Calculation and value statement;
- Appendix with photo documentation.

== Conclusion ==
From a theoretical point of view, the German income approach contains some interesting specifics: Even though in the determination of gross rental income it is quite similar to the US income approach, in its apportionment of income between land and improvements, which allows for the building's limited useful life-span to be taken into account, it also contains elements of the discounted cash flow approach.

German PAP generally advises to rely on existing numbers, but allows to fall back on empirical values and experience when needed. Being highly standardised, the Ertragswertverfahren - when applied professionally - offers the reader of the report the opportunity to quickly examine and assess its underlying assumptions.

== See also ==
- Cost approach
- Sales comparison approach
- Income approach
- Pricing
- Real estate business
