= Russian Society of Appraisers =

Professional association of Russian appraisers

The Russian Society of Appraisers
- Formation: 1993
- Location: Moscow, Russia,
- Members: over 6000 Valuation professionals
- Owner: professional membership-based organization
- Subsidiaries: The International Academy of Valuation and Consulting
- Affiliations: International Valuation Standards Committee
- Website: sroroo.ru

The Russian Society of Appraisers (RSA) is a premier organization of valuation professionals in Russia, embracing about 50% of recognized valuation professionals in the country from across various specialisms and geographical regions. It was the first national professional valuation society to be established in 1993 and the only Valuation Society to attain 'All-Russian Public Organization' status, with branches in the majority of constituent entities of the Russian Federation. It has the status of self-regulated organization (SRO), with current membership reaching over 6,000 individuals. Members of the Russian Society of Appraisers comprise both property and business valuation professionals.

== Functions ==
RSA performs a number of supervisory and disciplinary functions related to the national valuation profession, including regular professional audit and continuing professional development of its member valuers. Under the Russian Valuation Law, membership in a SRO Valuation Society is a precondition for individuals in gaining the right of valuation practice.
Its other functions include: adjudicating valuation-related disputes through its Experts Council, certifying valuation professionals and developing valuation standards. It is active in the area of valuation research and methodology through its subsidiary partner The International Academy of Valuation and Consulting, and hosts its semi-annual International Valuation Conferences to discuss advances in methodology and public valuation policy.
The Russian Society of Appraisers is a founder and publisher of the Voproci Ocenki Quarterly periodical, a leading national research periodical of the valuation profession.

== Affiliation ==
RSA is a member of the International Valuation Standards Committee (IVSC). Being a member of The European Group of Valuers Associations (TEGoVA), RSA also administers its prestigious "Recognized European Valuer" certification scheme.

Current affairs of the Russian Society of Appraisers are highlighted in its regular Bulletin The Russian Value.

== See also ==
- Real estate appraisal
- Valuation (finance)
