= Liquidation value =

Liquidation value is the likely price of an asset when it is allowed insufficient time to sell on the open market, thereby reducing its exposure to potential buyers. Liquidation value is typically lower than fair market value. Unlike cash or other available liquid assets, certain illiquid assets, like real estate, often require a period of several months in order to obtain their fair market value in a sale, and will generally sell for a significantly lower price if a sale is forced to occur in a shorter time period. The liquidation value may be either the result of a forced liquidation or an orderly liquidation. Either value assumes that the sale is consummated by a seller who is compelled to sell and assumes an exposure period which is less than normal.

The most common definition used by real estate appraisers is as follows

The most probable price that a specified interest in real property is likely to bring under all of the following conditions:

- Consummation of a sale will occur within a severely limited future marketing period specified by the client.
- The actual market conditions currently prevailing are those to which the appraised property interest is subject.
- The buyer is acting prudently and knowledgeably.
- The seller is under extreme compulsion to sell.
- The buyer is typically motivated.
- The buyer is acting in what he or she considers his or her best interest.
- A limited marketing effort and time will be allowed for the completion of a sale.
- Payment will be made in cash in U.S. dollars or in terms of financial arrangements comparable thereto.
- The price represents the normal consideration for the property sold, unaffected by special or creative financing or sales concessions granted by anyone associated with the sale.

Note that this definition differs from the most commonly used definitions of market value or fair market value.
