= The Uniform Standards for Federal Land Acquisition =

The Uniform Standards for Federal Land Acquisition (UASFLA), also known as the "Yellow Book", are the US federal Standards for Appraisals performed in connection to most Federal land acquisitions, exchanges, and/or dispensations. The standards are jointly published by The Appraisal Foundation and the US Department of Justice (DOJ). The UASFLA provides the following details regarding its production and publication:

"The Uniform Appraisal Standards for Federal Land Acquisitions have been developed, revised, approved, adopted and promulgated on behalf of the Interagency Land Acquisition Conference. The Conference is solely and exclusively responsible for the content of the Standards. The Appraisal Foundation provided editing and technical assistance to the Standards, but neither undertakes nor assumes any responsibility whatsoever for the content of the Standards. The Appraisal Foundation has published the Uniform Appraisal Standards for Federal Land Acquisitions on behalf of the Conference and in cooperation with the United States Department of Justice."
