= Lindsay v. Commissioners =

Lindsay v. Commissioners, 2 S.C.L. 38 (1796), was an early American case in South Carolina that found that a government taking to build a public road did not require compensation to the deprived property owners. The case as since been overturned by the interpretation of the "just compensation" requirement of the Fifth Amendment.
