= James Graaskamp =

James A. "Jim" Graaskamp (1933–1988) was an American professor and department chairman of real estate at the University of Wisconsin–Madison. He is credited with developing a multi-faceted ethics-based curriculum.

== Biography ==
Born in Milwaukee, Wisconsin, in 1933, Graaskamp was the son of Arnold G. and Lillian (Haufe) Graaskamp. His grandfather, Garret William Graaskamp, was born in Sheboygan County, Wisconsin, and his grandmother, Lavina Risseeuw, was born in the Netherlands. At the age of 17, Graaskamp contracted polio and became a quadriplegic, forcing him to abandon a football scholarship to Harvard.

In 1955, he earned a BA in English in creative writing from Rollins College in Winter Park, Florida. He received an MBA in finance, with a specialization in security analysis, from Marquette University in Milwaukee in 1957. In 1964, he earned a PhD in urban land economics and risk management from the University of Wisconsin–Madison. He began teaching real estate at the University of Wisconsin in 1964 and continued until his death in 1988 at the age of 54, at which time he was chair of the department. He was survived by his long-time companion, Jean Davis. Graaskamp, in almost every school year, hired students to live with him at his home on Breese Terrace, the university's football stadium, to assist with his personal care and travel with him on trips, including Alaska, Hawaii and Europe.

== Advocator on real estate ==
He thought that commercial properties offering higher tax yields and lower service demands created unnecessary barriers to building housing for the less well-off. In the 1970s, he began to advocate for an ethic in real estate proceedings, thinking that development has nearly irreversible impacts on the land. Graaskamp advocates an approach in his book, A Guide to Feasibility Analysis. During the savings and loan collapse of the 1990s, Graaskamp's concerns were widely seen as vindicated.

In 1982, James Graaskamp was named a trustee of the Urban Land Institute (ULI), a nonprofit education and research institute. In 2004, James Graaskamp was one of ten "real estate legends" profiled in a book published by ULI, Leadership Legacies. The ULI's textbook "Real Estate Development", fifth edition, is dedicated to Graaskamp.

In April 2007, the University of Wisconsin Center for Real Estate was officially renamed the James A. Graaskamp Center for Real Estate as part of a US$20 million alumni-led fundraising campaign. The James Graaskamp Landmark Research Collection at the University of Wisconsin was made public on October 25, 2007. It contains over 165 consulting reports from Landmark completed between the late 1960s and the early 1990s. There are appraisals, market and feasibility studies.

On October 15, 1989, the city of Madison established James A. Graaskamp Park to honor the legacy of James Graaskamp. It was the first accessible playground in Wisconsin. The park is privately owned by the Madison Development Corporation, a workforce housing provider. In August 2020, Madison Development Corporation (MDC), a nonprofit housing developer in Madison, dedicated "The Graaskamp Apartments" to Professor James A. Graaskamp. It has an exercise room, a leasing office, a board room and underground parking.
