= Value-in-use =

Value-in-use is the net present value (NPV) of a cash flow or other benefits that an asset generates for a specific owner under a specific use.

In the U.S., it is generally estimated at a use which is less than highest-and-best use, and therefore it is generally lower than market value.

When a particular user enjoys special benefits, such as extraordinary financing, agglomeration benefits, or grandfathered zoning, then the value may be higher than market value, and the value is considered to be an investment value.

== International Valuation Standards ==
The 2007 edition of International Valuation Standards (IVS 2007) re-states the International Financial Reporting Standards definition of 'value-in-use', which would allow for either a higher value than market value or a lower value than market value:

Value in Use The present value of the future cash flows expected to be derived from an asset or a cash-generating unit.

As defined in IVS2, investment value is the valuation equivalent of the accountancy concept of value-in-use. Whereas IFRSs define the accountancy concepts of fair value and value-in-use in operational terms, IVSs define Market Value and Investment Value by way of generalised definitions.

== Use in impairment testing ==
In financial reporting, value-in-use is used in impairment testing to estimate the recoverable amount of an asset or cash-generating unit. Under IAS 36, an asset is impaired when its carrying amount exceeds its recoverable amount, and recoverable amount is the higher of fair value less costs of disposal and value-in-use.

Value-in-use is based on the present value of the future cash flows expected to be derived from continuing use of the asset and from its disposal at the end of its useful life. The calculation generally uses management-approved cash-flow projections and a discount rate that reflects the time value of money and risks specific to the asset or cash-generating unit.
