= Private mortgage =

Mortgage loan

A private mortgage is a type of mortgage loan whereby funds can be sourced from another person or business rather than borrowing from a bank or other finance provider. The private lender could be family, friends or others with personal relationships to the borrower.

Private mortgages were once commonly put in place by solicitors in rural locations throughout the United Kingdom, where the solicitor put borrowers and lenders together and protected the arrangement by using the borrower’s property as security.

With increases to competition and regulation introduced during the 1980s under UK Prime Minister, Margaret Thatcher, private mortgages became less commonplace - their prominence has however returned in recent years due to the decline in traditional means of finance.
