= American Measurement Standard =

Standard to measure square footage of residences

The American Measurement Standard is an authoritative measurement standard for use with single-family dwellings. The AMS 2020 edition is a voluntary guide developed for the measurement, calculation, and communication of square footage in residential dwellings.

== Description ==
This standard defines eight specific categories for the reporting of all space associated with a residential dwelling. The AMS helps to establish common and logical definitions of "finished square footage" and "gross living area." The methodology of the American Measurement Standard was compiled and edited by a consensus of real estate professionals including real estate agents, appraisers, assessors, home builders and architects, and is based on the exterior dimensions of a dwelling. The AMS contains over three times more specific home measurement details than any other square footage guideline and includes numerous illustrations and examples. The standard provides acceptable square footage calculations for use in residential mortgage appraisals, and provides acceptable measurements for mortgage lenders. The principles and practices detailed in the standard have been used for generations in professional appraisal reports.
