= Investment value =

Concept in finance

Investment value is the value of a property to a particular investor. In the U.S. and U.K., it is equal to market value for the investor who has the capacity to put the property to good use—its highest-and-best-use, its most valuable use. For other investors with limited capacity or vision, investment value is lower because they cannot put the property to use in a way that is maximally productive.

== International Valuation Standards ==
The current edition of International Valuation Standards (IVS 2011) defines Investment Value in a way which allows for either a higher value than market value or a lower value than market value:

Investment value - the value of an asset to the owner or a prospective owner for individual investment or operational objectives.

Investment Value is a subjective measure of value, a 'value-in-use', whilst Market Value is an objective 'value-in-exchange'. As defined in IVS2, Investment Value is the valuation equivalent of the accountancy concept of Value-in-use. Whereas IFRSs define the accountancy concepts of fair value and Value-in-use in operational terms, IVSs define Market Value and Investment Value by way of generalised definitions.
