= Market value =

Price at which an asset would trade in a competitive auction setting

Market value or OMV (open market valuation) is the price at which an asset would trade in a competitive auction setting. Market value is often used interchangeably with open market value, fair value or fair market value, although these terms have distinct definitions in different standards, and differ in some circumstances.

== Definition ==
International Valuation Standards defines market value as "the estimated amount for which a property should exchange on the date of valuation between a willing buyer and a willing seller in an arm’s-length transaction after proper marketing wherein the parties had each acted knowledgeably, prudently, and without compulsion".

Market value is a concept distinct from market price, which is "the price at which one can transact", while market value is "the true underlying value" according to theoretical standards. The concept is most commonly invoked in situations where prevailing market prices are not reflective of true underlying market value. For market price to equal market value, the market must be informationally efficient and rational expectations must prevail.

Mocciaro Li Destri, Picone & Minà (2012) have underscored the subtle but important difference between the firms’ capacity to create value through correct operational choices and valid strategies, on the one hand, and the epiphenomenal manifestation of variations in stockholder value on the financial markets (notably on stock markets). In this perspective, they suggest implementing new methodologies able to bring strategy back into financial performance measures.

Market value is also distinct from fair value in that fair value depends on the parties involved, while market value does not. For example, IVS currently notes fair value "requires the assessment of the price that is fair between two specific parties taking into account the respective advantages or disadvantages that each will gain from the transaction. Although market value may meet these criteria, this is not necessarily always the case. Fair value is frequently used when undertaking due diligence in corporate transactions, where particular synergies between the two parties may mean that the price that is fair between them is higher than the price that might be obtainable in the wider market. In other words "special value" may be generated. Market value requires this element of "special value" to be disregarded, but it forms part of the assessment of fair value.

== Real estate ==
The term is commonly used in real estate appraisal, since real estate markets are generally considered both informationally and transactionally inefficient. Also, real estate markets are subject to prolonged periods of disequilibrium, such as in contamination situations or other market disruptions.

Appraisals are usually performed under some set of assumptions about transactional markets, and those assumptions are captured in the definition of value used for the appraisal. Commonly, the definition set forth for U.S. federally regulated lending institutions is used, although other definitions may also be used under some circumstances:

"The most probable price (in terms of money) which a property should bring in a competitive and open market under all conditions requisite to a fair sale, the buyer and seller each acting prudently and knowledgeably, and assuming the price is not affected by undue stimulus. Implicit in this definition is the consummation of a sale as of a specified date and the passing of title from seller to buyer under conditions whereby: the buyer and seller are typically motivated; both parties are well informed or well advised, and acting in what they consider their best interests; a reasonable time is allowed for exposure in the open market; payment is made in terms of cash in United States dollars or in terms of financial arrangements comparable thereto; and the price represents the normal consideration for the property sold unaffected by special or creative financing or sales concessions granted by anyone associated with the sale."

In the US, licensed or certified appraisers may be required under state, federal, or local laws to develop appraisals subject to USPAP Uniform Standards of Professional Appraisal Practice. The Uniform Standards of Professional Appraisal Practice requires that when market value is the applicable definition, the appraisal must also contain an analysis of the highest and best use as well as an estimation of exposure time. All states require mandatory licensure of appraisers.

USPAP does not require that all real estate appraisals be performed based on a single definition of market value. There are frequent situations when appraisers are called upon to appraise properties using other value definitions. If a value other than market value is appropriate, USPAP only requires that the appraiser provide both the definition of value being used and the citation for that definition.

=== Other definitions ===
Market value is the most commonly used type of value in real estate appraisal in the United States because it is required for all federally regulated mortgage transactions, and because it has been accepted by US courts as valid. However, real estate appraisers use many other definitions of value in other situations.

==== Liquidation value ====
Liquidation value is the most probable price that a specified interest in real property is likely to bring under all of the following conditions:

1. Consummation of a sale will occur within a severely limited future marketing period specified by the client.
2. The actual market conditions currently prevailing are those to which the appraise property interest is subject.
3. The buyer is acting prudently and knowledgeably.
4. The seller is under extreme compulsion to sell.
5. The buyer is typically motivated.
6. The buyer is acting in what he or she considered his or her best interest.
7. A limited marketing effort and time will be allowed for the completion of the sale.
8. Payment will be made in cash in U.S. dollars or in terms of financial arrangements comparable thereto.
9. The price represents the normal consideration for the property sold, unaffected by special or creative financing or sales concessions granted by anyone associated with the sale.

==== Orderly liquidation value ====
This value definition differs from the previous one in that it assumes an orderly transition, and not "extreme compulsion".

==== Federal land acquisition ====
For land acquisitions by or funded by U.S. federal agencies, a slightly different definition applies:

"Fair market value is defined as the amount in cash or terms reasonably equivalent to cash, for which in all probability the property would be sold by a knowledgeable owner willing but not obligated to sell to a knowledgeable purchaser who desired but is not obligated to buy. In ascertaining that figure, consideration should be given to all matters that might be brought forward and reasonably be given substantial weight in bargaining by persons of ordinary prudence, but no consideration whatever should be given to matters not affecting market value."

==== Going concern value ====
When a real estate appraiser works with a business valuation appraiser (and perhaps an equipment and machinery appraiser) to provide a value of the combination of a business and the real estate used for that business, the specific market value is called "going concern value". It recognizes that the combined market value may be different from the sum of the separate values: "The market value of all the tangible and intangible assets of an established operating business with an indefinite life, as if sold in aggregate."

==== Use value ====
Use value takes into account a specific use for the subject property and does not attempt to ascertain the highest and best use of the real estate. For example, the appraisal may focus on the contributory value of the real estate to a business enterprise.

Some property tax jurisdictions allow agricultural use appraisals for farmland. Also, current IRS estate tax regulations allow land under an interim agricultural use to be valued according to its current use regardless of development potential.

== Economic value and investor confidence ==
Stability and economic growth are two factors that international investors are seeking when considering investment options. A country offering economic value amongst its other incentives attracts investment. A political unrest situation can be the cause of not only loss of confidence, but a reduced value in currency, creating transfer of capital to other and more stable sources.

In the event of a government printing currency to discharge a portion of a significant amount of debt, the supply of money is increased, with an ultimate reduction in its value, aggravated by inflation. Furthermore, should a government be unable to service its deficit by way of selling domestic bonds, thereby increasing the supply of money, it must increase the volume of saleable securities to foreigners, which in turn creates a decrease in their value.

A significant debt can prove a concern for foreign investors, should they believe there is a risk of the country defaulting on its obligations. They will be reluctant to purchase securities subject to that particular currency, if there is a perceived, significant risk of default. It is for this reason that the debt rating of a country; for example, as determined by Moody's or Standard & Poor's is a crucial indicator of its exchange rate.

Currency values and exchange rates play a crucial part in the rate of return on investments. Value for an investor, is the exchange rate of the currency which, contains the bulk of a portfolio, determining its real return. A declining value in the exchange rate has the effect of decreasing the purchasing power of income and capital gains, derived from any returns. In addition, other income factors such as interest rates, inflation and even capital gains from domestic securities, are influenced by the influential and complex factors, of the exchange rate.

== Legal interpretation ==
The case of Luxmoore-May and Another v. Messenger May Baverstock [1990] 1 W.L.R. 1009 illustrates the legal interpretation of market value: "The measure of damage in this case is, I conclude, the difference between what the foxhounds in fact realised consequent on the defendants' breach of contract and what was their true open market value at that time. What better guide could there be to that value than the price at which these paintings happened to be knocked down at Sotheby's so shortly afterwards? The price which the international art market was willing to pay was surely prima facie the best evidence of the foxhounds' value."
