= Sales comparison approach =

Real estate appraisal valuation method

The sales comparison approach (SCA) is a real estate appraisal valuation method that relies on the assumption that a matrix of attributes or significant features of a property drive its value. For examples, in the case of a single family residence, such attributes might be floor area, views, location, number of bathrooms, lot size, age of the property and condition of property. This method is in contrast to the two other main pricing methods for real estate, the cost approach and the income approach.

== Economic basis ==
The sales comparison approach is based upon the principles of supply and demand, as well as upon the principle of substitution. Supply and demand indicates value through typical market behavior of both buyers and sellers. Substitution indicates that a purchaser would not purchase an improved property for any value higher than it could be replaced for on a site with equivalent utility, assuming no undue delays in construction.

== Examples of methods ==
In practice, the most common SCA method used by estate agents and real estate appraisers is the sales adjustment grid. It uses a small number of recently sold properties in the immediate vicinity of the subject property to estimate the value of its attributes. Adjustments to the comparables may be determined by trend analysis, matched-pairs analysis, or simple surveys of the market.

More advanced researchers and appraisers commonly employ statistical techniques based on multiple regression methods which generally compare a larger number of more geographically dispersed property transactions to determine the significance and magnitude of the impact of different attributes on property value. Research has shown that the sales adjustment grid and the multiple regression model are theoretically the same, with the former applying more heuristic methods and the latter using statistical techniques.

Spatial auto regression plagues these statistical techniques, since high priced properties tend to cluster together and therefore one property price is not independent of its neighbor. Given property inflation and price cycles, both comparison techniques can become unreliable if the time interval between transactions sampled is excessive. The other factor undermining a simplistic use of the SCA is the evolving nature of city neighborhoods, though in reality urban evolution occurs gradually enough to minimize its impact on this approach to value.

In more complex situations, such as litigation or contaminated property appraisal, appraisers develop SCA adjustments using widely accepted advanced techniques, such as repeat sales models (to measure house price appreciation over time), survey research (e.g. contingent valuation), case studies (to develop adjustments in complex situations) or other statistically based techniques.

== See also ==
- Real estate appraisal
- Cost approach
- Income approach
- German income approach
- Pricing
- Real estate business
