= Creative financing =

Uncommon means of buying property

In real estate, creative financing is non-traditional or uncommon means of buying land or property. The goal of creative financing is generally to purchase, or finance a property, with the buyer/investor using as little of his own money as possible, otherwise known as leveraging. Using these techniques an investor may be able to purchase multiple properties using little, or none, of his "own money".

== Types ==
=== Hard money loans ===
Hard money loans (abbreviated as HML) are similar to private mortgages except that they are made through a hard money lender. A hard money lender may get his financing either from his own contacts with private lenders, or financial institutions with whom he has established his own lines of credit.

Hard money loans are made to real estate investors for the purpose of investing in and rehabbing real estate. Rates are a little higher than borrowing directly from a private lender, as the hard money lender may also be collecting yield spread. The hard money lender will also charge points of 3% to 6% or more. These points are often paid up front, but a few lenders may roll these into the loan.

Hard money loans are high-interest mortgages available from private investors. Desperate borrowers with poor credit scores, bankruptcies, no verifiable income, or too much debt often take out hard money loans when they are unable to qualify for traditional mortgages. Hard money becomes a last resort when borrowers cannot meet the lending standards set by banks or government sponsored enterprises such as Fannie Mae and Freddie Mac.

=== Private mortgages ===
A private mortgage is a loan secured by real estate that is made by a private lender, instead of a traditional lender, financial institution, or government institution. These loans are most commonly short term and last anywhere from 6 months to three years. These are asset based loans made for the purchase and rehabilitation of real estate. Because the loans are asset based, the decision to loan is based on the criteria of the property and not usually the qualifications, or credit of the borrower.

Interest rates on these loans are considerably higher than traditional loans and may range from 12% to 18%, with points sometimes being required as well. Loans are made on an LTV (loan to value) of 65% to 70%, to preserve sufficient equity in the property for the private lender in the event of default.

=== Simultaneous closings ===
A simultaneous closing allows a home seller to offer owner financing on a property without having to hold any mortgage. On closing day, the property title is transferred to the buyer and the newly created (owner-financed) mortgage is sold to a note investor for cash, simultaneously.

=== Subject-to ===
A subject-to transaction is a creative finance technique where a buyer is able to take title to property without obtaining a loan in the traditional manner. The transaction usually involves the seller of the property leaving his or her existing financing in place. This process is similar to assuming a loan, but differs because it usually takes place without the knowledge of the original lending institution and operates outside the original terms of the loan. This technique is useful because it affords the buyer the ability to obtain financing without the need for transaction costs and does not tie up capital to obtain a new loan. The technique also allows the buyer to purchase property quickly without going through the arduous loan origination process. At the same time, it offers a creative solution for sellers with minimal equity in the home who would not be able to sell on market.

=== Land trust ===
A land trust is an agreement whereby one party (the trustee) agrees to hold ownership of a piece of real property for the benefit of another party (the beneficiary). Land trusts are used by nonprofit organizations to hold conservation easements, by corporations and investment groups to compile large tracts of land, and by individuals to keep their real estate ownership private, avoid probate and provide several other benefits.

In the application of creative financing, a land trust can be used to take control of a property while keeping the name of the owner private. While this does not prevent the lending institution from invoking the due on sale clause, it will make it harder for the lending institution to detect that the property has been sold using creative financing.

=== Short sale ===
In a short sale, the seller owes more than the home is worth, as they are often several payments behind and may even be close to foreclosure. As a result, the lending bank may agree to a sale of the property for less than is owed on it. In order for a bank to agree to take less than the homeowner owes on his mortgage, the seller must often show significant hardships that have led them to being unable to continue making payments on this property. The seller will give the short sale investor a contract to purchase the property, a deed that will probably be placed in escrow, power of attorney and a number of other documents that will give them full control of the property. The investor will then present a case to the bank holding the mortgage, that the seller is no longer able to make payments, is having to relinquish control of the property and that the loan on the property must be reduced in order for the investor to purchase the property.

The term "short sale" is a misnomer because it has nothing to do with shorting anything in the financial sense. These transactions can also take a significant amount of time so it is not called a "short sale" for that reason either. However, the process is shorter than the traditional process of going through foreclosure and sale by auction, which is still likely to take much longer.

This is a method to sell your house quickly, because effectively you pass over control of your property to the short sale investor immediately upon signing of the documents. From that time on, it is up to the investor to complete the transaction. Should a bank refuse to accept the investor's offer on a short sale, there is no guarantee that the house will not go to foreclosure anyway, but this does provide the seller a "possibility to avoid foreclosure", when all else has failed.

This technique may also be used to stop foreclosure long enough to allow another purchase, or something else to be done with the property.

== See also ==
- Creative accounting
- Seller financing
