= Cost approach =

Valuation method in real estate appraisal

Cost approach is a real estate appraisal valuation method used to price an individual property. It is one of three methods, the others being market approach, or sales comparison approach, and income approach. The fundamental premise of the cost approach is that a potential user of real estate will not, or should not, pay more for a property than it would cost to build an equivalent. The cost of construction minus depreciation, plus land, therefore is a limit, or at least a metric, of market value.

== Methodology ==
There are some fairly large assumptions embedded in the approach. One of the basics is that there is a sufficient supply of buildable land that construction is a viable alternative to purchase of an existing property. In some parts of the world today, including in the US, there are areas which are either so fully developed, or so restrictive in their planning approvals, that new construction is not an option because of the scarcity of land. A related question is whether the building in question is anything that would actually be built again in that market. If the trend of development favors, say, high volume warehousing, would anyone consider building a multi-story manufacturing facility? If the trend is to high density condominium buildings, would anyone consider building a detached house? The cost of constructing an obsolete building is not considered relevant to market value.

There are other methodological issues which can be problematic. How do you estimate cost? Is it based on reproduction of an exact replica or something that is judged to be functionally equivalent? Can you even estimate cost very exactly? When a project is put up to bid, is there not usually a range of prices offered for the same plans and specifications? Is the final cost of a project equal to the original bid? How should profit be treated? Some maintain that the cost approach will normally be the highest of the three approaches. At the same time it is a truism that a project is only feasible if its projected cost is less than its completed value.

In between new and totally obsolete various negative elements related to age, fashion and change (depreciation) will accrue. These are lumped into physical (wear, tear and deterioration), functional (look, feel, form and style), and locational (the influence of factors outside the property itself).

It is generally considered that the cost approach gives the best indication of market value when the property in question is new and an appropriate (highest and best) use.

== See also ==
- Income approach
- Sales comparison approach
- German income approach
- Pricing
- Real estate business
