= Income approach =

The income approach is a real estate appraisal valuation method. It is one of three major groups of methodologies, called valuation approaches, used by appraisers. It is particularly common in commercial real estate appraisal and in business appraisal. The fundamental math is similar to the methods used for financial valuation, securities analysis, or bond pricing. However, there are some significant and important modifications when used in real estate or business valuation.

While there are quite a few acceptable methods under the rubric of the income approach, most of these methods fall into three categories: direct capitalization, discounted cash flow, and gross income multiplier.

== Direct capitalization ==
This is simply the quotient of dividing the annual net operating income (NOI) by the appropriate capitalization rate ("cap rate"). For income-producing real estate, the NOI is the net income of the real estate (but not the business interest) plus any interest expense and non-cash items (e.g. depreciation) minus a reserve for replacement. The CAP rate may be determined in one of several ways, including market extraction, band-of-investments, or a built-up method. When appraising complex property, or property which has a risk-adjustment due to unusual factors (e.g. contamination), a risk-adjusted cap rate is appropriate. An implicit assumption in direct capitalization is that the cash flow is a perpetuity and the cap rate is a constant. If either cash flows or risk levels are expected to change, then direct capitalization fails and a discounted cash flow method must be used.

In UK practice, net income is capitalised by use of market-derived yields. If the property is rack-rented then the All Risks Yield will be used. However, if the passing rent differs from the Estimated Rental Value (ERV), then either the Term & Reversion, Layer or Equivalent Yield methods will be employed. In essence, these entail discounting the different income streams - that of the current or passing rent and that of the reversion to the full rental value - at different adjusted yields.

However, capitalization rate inherently includes the investment-specific risk premium. Each investor may have a different view of risk and, therefore, arrive at a different capitalization rate for a given investment. The relationship becomes clear when the capitalization rate is derived from the discount rate using the build-up cost of capital model. The two are identical whenever the earnings growth rate equals 0.

== Discounted cash flow ==
The Discounted cash flow model is analogous to net present value estimation in finance. However, appraisers often mistakenly use a market-derived cap rate and NOI as substitutes for the discount rate and/or the annual cash flow. The Cap rate equals the discount rate plus-or-minus a factor for anticipated growth. The NOI may be used if market value is the goal, but if investment value is the goal, then some other measure of cash flow is appropriate.

== Gross Rent Multiplier ==
The GRM is simply the ratio of the monthly (or annual) rent divided into the selling price. If several similar properties have sold in the market recently, then the GRM can be computed for those and applied to the anticipated monthly rent for the subject property. GRM is useful for rental houses, duplexes, and simple commercial properties when used as a supplement to other more well developed methods.

== Short-cut DCF ==
The Short-cut DCF method is based on a model developed by Professor Neil Crosby of the University of Reading (and ultimately based on earlier work by Wood and Greaves). The RICS have encouraged use of the method in appropriate circumstances. The Short-cut DCF is an adaptation to property valuation of the DCF method, which is widely used in finance.

In the Short-cut DCF, the passing rent, which is constant (in nominal or real terms) for the duration of the rent period, is discounted at an appropriate rate of return (possibly derived by reference to the risk-free rate of return obtained on government bonds, to which is added an allowance for risk and an allowance for the illiquidity of property assets). The reversion is discounted at the market-derived All Risks Yield (ARY), which correctly implies growth in the reversionary income stream. The reversionary income is the current Estimated Rental Value (ERV) inflated by an appropriate annual growth factor (or CAGR - Compound Annual Growth Rate). The crux of the Crosby-Wood model, and that which sets it apart from the customary DCF, is that the growth factor is derived by means of formula, as a function of the rate of return and the All Risks Yield. For example, if the rate of return is 10% per annum, the ARY is 8% per annum and rent is reviewed annually, then the growth factor will be 2%. (This simple subtraction only works when rent is reviewed annually - in all other situations the growth factor is derived by use of the Crosby formula.) Thus the Short-cut DCF produces a mathematically consistent valuation and country

== Recent Advances: Fully Explicit Short-cut DCF ==
An enhancement to the income approach has been proposed by Natalie Bayfield (2025) through the development of a fully explicit shortcut discounted cash flow (DCF) model. Traditional income approaches often rely on implicit or partially explicit DCF methods, where the terminal value is calculated using a capitalisation rate. Bayfield's method replaces this with an explicit terminal valuation derived directly from growth and return inputs, thereby removing the need for a capitalisation rate and avoiding the circularity that can arise when entry and exit assumptions are inconsistently applied. This model promotes reconciliation between implicit and explicit valuation approaches and supports more accurate assessments of properties with complex lease patterns or varying holding periods. The fully explicit shortcut DCF framework aligns with recent valuation guidance encouraging the use of more transparent, analytically robust methods.

== See also ==
- Cost approach
- Sales comparison approach
- German income approach
- Pricing
- Real estate business
