= Appraisal Institute =

Professional association of appraisers

The Appraisal Institute (AI), headquartered in Chicago, Illinois, is an international association of professional real estate appraisers. It was founded in January 1991 when the American Institute of Real Estate Appraisers (AIREA) and the Society of Residential Appraisers merged. The AIREA and the Society were respectively founded in 1932 and 1935. Real estate appraisal emerged as a profession at this point in response to the crash of home values as a result of the Great Depression, building on the intellectual frameworks developed over the course of the 1920s by land value theorists like Ernest McKinley Fisher, Frederick Babcock, Homer Hoyt, and Richard T. Ely. As of February 2007, the Appraisal Institute has more than 21,000 members and 99 chapters throughout the United States, Canada, and overseas.

The group publishes the Appraisal Journal.

== See also ==
- International Valuation Standards Committee
