= Business valuation =

Determination of the economic value of a business

Business valuation is a process and a set of procedures used to estimate the economic value of an owner's interest in a business. Here various valuation techniques are used by the interested counterparties to determine the price they are willing to pay or receive to effect a sale of the business. In addition to estimating the selling price of a business, the same valuation tools are often used by business appraisers to resolve disputes related to estate and gift taxation, divorce litigation, allocate business purchase price among business assets, establish a formula for estimating the value of partners' ownership interest for buy-sell agreements, and many other business and legal purposes such as in shareholders deadlock, divorce litigation and estate contest.

Specialized business valuation credentials include the Chartered Business Valuator (CBV) offered by the CBV Institute, ASA and CEIV from the American Society of Appraisers, and the Certified Valuation Analyst (CVA) by the National Association of Certified Valuators and Analysts; these professionals may be known as business valuators. In some cases, the court would appoint a forensic accountant as the joint-expert doing the business valuation. Here, attorneys should always be prepared to have their expert's report withstand the scrutiny of cross-examination and criticism.

Business valuation takes a different perspective as compared to the valuation of publicly listed company shares, which is about calculating theoretical values of listed companies and their stocks, for the purposes of share trading and investment management. This distinction derives mainly from the use of the results: stock investors intend to profit from price movement, whereas a business owner is focused on the enterprise as a total, going concern.

A second distinction is re corporate finance: when two corporates are involved, the valuation and transaction is within the realm of "mergers and acquisitions", and is managed by an investment bank, whereas in other contexts, the valuation and subsequent transactions are generally handled by a business valuator and business broker respectively.

== Estimates of business value ==
The evidence on the market value of specific businesses varies widely, largely depending on reported market transactions in the equity of the firm. A fraction of businesses are publicly traded, meaning that their equity can be purchased and sold by investors in stock markets available to the general public. Publicly traded companies on major stock markets have an easily calculated market capitalization that is a direct estimate of the market value of the firm's equity. Some publicly traded firms have relatively few recorded trades (including many firms traded over the counter or in pink sheets). A much larger number of firms are privately held. In these firms—which include corporations, partnerships, limited liability companies, and other organizational structures—equity interests are typically traded privately and often infrequently. As a result, previous transactions offer limited insight into a private company's current value. This is because business value fluctuates over time, and share prices are subject to significant uncertainty due to limited market visibility and high transaction costs.

A number of stock market indicators in the United States and other countries provide an indication of the market value of publicly traded firms. The Survey of Consumer Finance in the U.S. also includes an estimate of household ownership of stocks, including indirect ownership through mutual funds. The 2004 and 2007 SCF indicate a growing trend in stock ownership, with 51% of households indicating a direct or indirect ownership of stocks, with the majority of those respondents indicating indirect ownership through mutual funds. Few indications are available on the value of privately held firms. Anderson (2009) recently estimated the market value of U.S. privately held and publicly traded firms, using Internal Revenue Service and SCF data. He estimates that privately held firms produced more income for investors, and had more value than publicly held firms, in 2004.

== Standard and premise of value ==
Before the value of a business can be measured, the valuation assignment must specify the reason for and circumstances surrounding the business valuation. These are formally known as the business value standard and premise of value.

The standard of value is the hypothetical conditions under which the business will be valued. The premise of value relates to the assumptions, such as assuming that the business will continue forever in its current form (going concern), or that the value of the business lies in the proceeds from the sale of all of its assets minus the related debt (sum of the parts or assemblage of business assets). When done correctly, a valuation should reflect the capacity of the business to match a certain market demand, as it is the only true predictor of future cash flows.

=== Standards of value ===
- Fair market value – a value of a business enterprise determined between a willing buyer and a willing seller both in full knowledge of all the relevant facts and neither compelled to conclude a transaction.
- Investment value – a value the company has to a particular investor. The effect of synergy is included in valuation under the investment standard of value.
- Intrinsic value – the measure of business value that reflects the investor's in-depth understanding of the company's economic potential.

=== Premises of value ===
- Going concern – value in continued use as an ongoing operating business enterprise.
- Assemblage of assets – value of assets in place but not used to conduct business operations.
- Orderly disposition – value of business assets in exchange, where the assets are to be disposed of individually and not used for business operations.
- Liquidation – value in exchange when business assets are to be disposed of in a forced liquidation.

Premise of value for fair value calculation

- In use – if the asset would provide maximum value to the market participants principally through its use in combination with other assets as a group.
- In exchange – if the asset would provide maximum value to the market participants principally on a stand-alone basis.

Business valuation results can vary considerably depending upon the choice of both the standard and premise of value. In an actual business sale, it would be expected that the buyer and seller, each with an incentive to achieve an optimal outcome, would determine the fair market value of a business asset that would compete in the market for such an acquisition. If the synergies are specific to the company being valued, they may not be considered. Fair value also does not incorporate discounts for lack of control or marketability.

However, it is possible to achieve the fair market value for a business asset that is being liquidated in its secondary market. This underscores the difference between the standard and premise of value.

These assumptions might not, and probably do not, reflect the actual conditions of the market in which the subject business might be sold. However, these conditions are assumed because they yield a uniform standard of value, after applying generally accepted valuation techniques, which allows meaningful comparison between businesses which are similarly situated.

== Elements ==
=== Economic conditions ===
A business valuation report generally begins with a summary of the purpose and scope of business appraisal as well as its date and stated audience. Following is then a description of national, regional and local economic conditions existing as of the valuation date, as well as the conditions of the industry in which the subject business operates. A common source of economic information for the first section of the business valuation report is the Federal Reserve Board's Beige Book, published eight times a year by the Federal Reserve Bank. State governments and industry associations also publish useful statistics describing regional and industry conditions. Valuators use these as well as other published surveys and industry reports. The net present value (NPV) for similar companies may vary depending on the country because of the different time-value of money, country risk and risk-free rate.

=== Financial analysis ===
The financial statement analysis generally involves common size analysis, ratio analysis (liquidity, turnover, profitability, etc.), trend analysis and industry comparative analysis. This permits the valuation analyst to compare the subject company to other businesses in the same or similar industry, and to discover trends affecting the company and/or the industry over time. By comparing a company's financial statements in different time periods, the valuation expert can view growth or decline in revenues or expenses, changes in capital structure, or other financial trends. How the subject company compares to the industry will help with the risk assessment and ultimately help determine the discount rate and the selection of market multiples.

It is important to mention that among the financial statements, the primary statement to show the liquidity of the company is cash flow. Cash flow shows the company's cash in and out flow.

==== Normalization of financial statements ====
The key objective of normalization is to identify the ability of the business to generate income for its owners. A measure of the income is the amount of cash flow that the owners can remove from the business without adversely affecting its operations. The most common normalization adjustments fall into the following four categories:

- Comparability adjustments. The valuer may adjust the subject company's financial statements to facilitate a comparison between the subject company and other businesses in the same industry or geographic location. These adjustments are intended to eliminate differences between the way that published industry data is presented and the way that the subject company's data is presented in its financial statements.
- Non-operating adjustments. It is reasonable to assume that if a business were sold in a hypothetical sales transaction (which is the underlying premise of the fair market value standard), the seller would retain any assets which were not related to the production of earnings or price those non-operating assets separately. For this reason, non-operating assets (such as excess cash) are usually eliminated from the balance sheet.
- Non-recurring adjustments. The subject company's financial statements may be affected by events that are not expected to recur, such as the purchase or sale of assets, a lawsuit, or an unusually large revenue or expense. These non-recurring items are adjusted so that the financial statements will better reflect the management's expectations of future performance.
- Discretionary adjustments. The owners of private companies may be paid at variance from the market level of compensation that similar executives in the industry might command. In order to determine fair market value, the owner's compensation, benefits, perquisites and distributions must be adjusted to industry standards. Similarly, the rent paid by the subject business for the use of property owned by the company's owners individually may be scrutinized.

=== Approach to valuation ===
Three different approaches are commonly used in business valuation: the income approach, the asset-based approach, and the market approach. Within each of these approaches, there are various techniques for determining the value of a business using the definition of value appropriate for the appraisal assignment. Generally,

- the income approaches determine value by calculating the net present value of the benefit stream generated by the business (discounted cash flow);
- the asset-based approaches determine value by adding the sum of the parts of the business (net asset value);
- and the market approaches determine value by comparing the subject company to other companies in the same industry, of the same size, and/or within the same region.

However, many small businesses will use the Seller Discretionary Method as a practical, simple method of business valuation. This approach can then be blended with the income, asset-based, and market approaches for a robust valuation analysis.

A number of business valuation models can be constructed that utilize various methods under the three business valuation approaches. Venture Capitalists and Private Equity professionals have long used the First Chicago Method which essentially combines the income approach with the market approach. In certain cases equity may also be valued by applying the techniques and frameworks developed for financial options, via a real options framework, as discussed below. The valuation approach may also differ by industry and / or given the business context.

In determining which of these approaches to use, the valuation professional must exercise discretion. Each technique has advantages and drawbacks, which must be considered when applying those techniques to a particular subject company. Most treatises and court decisions encourage the valuator to consider more than one technique, which must be reconciled with each other to arrive at a value conclusion. A measure of common sense and a good grasp of mathematics is helpful.

== Valuation ==
The various approaches to valuation are detailed in the following sections. See also Valuation (finance) § Business valuation.

=== Income approach ===
The income approach relies upon the economic principle of expectation: the value of business is based on the expected economic benefit and level of risk associated with the investment. Income based valuation methods determine fair market value by dividing the benefit stream generated by the subject or target company times a discount or capitalization rate. The discount or capitalization rate converts the stream of benefits into present value.

There are several different income methods, including capitalization of earnings or cash flows, discounted future cash flows ("DCF"), and the excess earnings method (which is a hybrid of asset and income approaches). The result of a value calculation under the income approach is generally the fair market value of a controlling, marketable interest in the subject company, since the entire benefit stream of the subject company is most often valued, and the capitalization and discount rates are derived from statistics concerning public companies. IRS Revenue Ruling 59-60 states that earnings are preeminent for the valuation of closely held operating companies.

However, income valuation methods can also be used to establish the value of a severable business asset as long as an income stream can be attributed to it. An example is licensable intellectual property whose value needs to be established to arrive at a supportable royalty structure.

==== Discount or capitalization rates ====
A discount rate or capitalization rate is used to determine the present value of the expected returns of a business. The discount rate and capitalization rate are closely related to each other, but distinguishable. Generally speaking, the discount rate or capitalization rate may be defined as the yield necessary to attract investors to a particular investment, given the risks associated with that investment.

- In DCF valuations, the discount rate, often an estimate of the cost of capital for the business, is used to calculate the net present value of a series of projected cash flows. The discount rate can also be viewed as the required rate of return the investors expect to receive from the business enterprise, given the level of risk they undertake.
- On the other hand, a capitalization rate is applied in methods of business valuation that are based on business data for a single period of time. For example, in real estate valuations for properties that generate cash flows, a capitalization rate may be applied to the net operating income (NOI) (i.e., income before depreciation and interest expenses) of the property for the trailing twelve months.

There are several different methods of determining the appropriate discount rates. The discount rate is composed of two elements: the risk-free rate, which is the return that an investor would expect from a secure, practically risk-free investment, such as a high quality government bond; plus a risk premium that compensates an investor for the relative level of risk associated with a particular investment in excess of the risk-free rate. Most importantly, the selected discount or capitalization rate must be consistent with stream of benefits to which it is to be applied.

Capitalization and discounting valuation calculations become mathematically equivalent under the assumption that the business income grows at a constant rate.

Once the capitalization rate or discount rate is determined, it must be applied to an appropriate economic income stream: pretax cash flow, aftertax cash flow, pretax net income, after tax net income, excess earnings, projected cash flow, etc. The result of this formula is the indicated value before discounts. Before moving on to calculate discounts, however, the valuation professional must consider the indicated value under the asset and market approaches.

Careful matching of the discount rate to the appropriate measure of economic income is critical to the accuracy of the business valuation results. Net cash flow is a frequent choice in professionally conducted business appraisals. The rationale behind this choice is that this earnings basis corresponds to the equity discount rate derived from the build-up, or CAPM, models: the returns obtained from investments in publicly traded companies can easily be represented in terms of net cash flows. At the same time, the discount rates are generally also derived from the public capital markets data.

===== Weighted average cost of capital =====
The weighted average cost of capital (WACC) is an approach to determining a discount rate that incorporates both equity and debt financing; the method determines the subject company's actual cost of capital by calculating the weighted average of the company's cost of debt and cost of equity. The debt cost is essentially the company's after tax interest rate; the cost of equity, as discussed below, is typically calculated via the CAPM, but often employing an alternative method.

The resultant discount rate is used for cases where the overall cashflows are discounted—i.e. as opposed to the cashflows to equity—and is thus applied to the subject company's net cash flow to total invested capital.

One of the problems with this method is that the valuator may elect to calculate WACC according to the subject company's existing capital structure, the average industry capital structure, or the optimal capital structure. Such discretion detracts from the objectivity of this approach, in the minds of some critics.

Since the WACC captures the risk of the subject business itself, the existing or contemplated capital structures, rather than industry averages, are the appropriate choices for business valuation.

===== Capital asset pricing model =====
The capital asset pricing model (CAPM) provides one method of determining a discount rate in business valuation. The CAPM originated from the Nobel Prize-winning studies of Harry Markowitz, James Tobin, and William Sharpe. The method derives the discount rate by adding risk premium to the risk-free rate. The risk premium is derived by multiplying the equity risk premium with beta, a measure of stock price volatility. Beta is compiled by various researchers for particular industries and companies, and measures systematic risks of investment.

One of the criticisms of the CAPM is that beta is derived from volatility of prices of publicly traded companies, which differ from non-publicly companies in liquidity, marketability, capital structures and control. Other aspects such as access to credit markets, size, and management depth are generally different, too. Where a privately held company can be shown to be sufficiently similar to a public company, the CAPM may be suitable. However, it requires the knowledge of market stock prices for calculation. For private companies that do not sell stock on the public capital markets, this information is not readily available. Therefore, calculation of beta for private firms is problematic. The build-up cost of capital model, discussed below, is the typical choice in such cases.

===== Alternative valuation approaches and factor models =====
With regard to capital market-oriented valuation approaches there are numerous valuation approaches besides the traditional CAPM model. They include, for example, the arbitrage pricing theory (APT) as well as the consumption-based capital asset pricing model (CCAPM). Furthermore, alternative capital market models were developed, having in common that expected return hinge on multiple risk sources and thus being less restrictive:

- Models of the Q theory
- Fama–French three-factor model
- Carhart four-factor model
- Fama–French five-factor model

Nevertheless, even these models are not wholly consistent, as they also show market anomalies. However, the method of incomplete replication and risk covering come along without the need of capital market data and thus being more solid. Additionally, the existence of investment-based approaches, considering different investment opportunities and determining an investment program by means of linear optimization. Among them the approximative decomposition valuation approach can be found.

====== Modified capital asset pricing model ======
The cost of equity (Ke) is computed by using the modified capital asset pricing model (Mod. CAPM)

$k_e = R_f + \beta ( R_m-R_f) + SCRP + CSRP$

Where:

$R_f$ = Risk free rate of return (generally taken as 10-year government bond yield)

$\beta$ = Beta value (sensitivity of the stock returns to market returns)

$k_e$ = Cost of equity

$R_m$ = Market rate of return

SCRP = Small company risk premium

CSRP = Company specific risk premium

====== Build-up method ======
The build-up method is a widely recognized method of determining the after-tax net cash flow discount rate, which in turn yields the capitalization rate. The figures used in the build-Up method are derived from various sources. This method is called a build-up method because it is the sum of risks associated with various classes of assets. It is based on the principle that investors would require a greater return on classes of assets that are more risky.

- The first element of a build-up capitalization rate is the risk-free rate, which is the rate of return for long-term government bonds.
- Investors who buy large-cap equity stocks, which are inherently more risky than long-term government bonds, require a greater return, so the next element of the build-up method is the equity risk premium. In determining a company's value, the long-horizon equity risk premium is used because the Company's life is assumed to be infinite. The sum of the risk-free rate and the equity risk premium yields the long-term average market rate of return on large public company stocks.
- Similarly, investors who invest in small cap stocks, which are riskier than blue-chip stocks, require a greater return, called the "size premium". Size premium data is generally available from two sources: Morningstar's (formerly Ibbotson & Associates') Stocks, Bonds, Bills & Inflation and Duff & Phelps' Risk Premium Report.

By adding the first three elements of a build-up discount rate, we can determine the rate of return that investors would require on their investments in small public company stocks. These three elements of the build-up discount rate are known collectively as the systematic risks. This type of investment risk cannot be avoided through portfolio diversification. It arises from external factors and affect every type of investment in the economy. As a result, investors taking systematic risk are rewarded by an additional premium.

In addition to systematic risks, the discount rate must include unsystematic risk representing that portion of total investment risk that can be avoided through diversification. Public capital markets do not provide evidence of unsystematic risk since investors that fail to diversify cannot expect additional returns. Unsystematic risk falls into one of two categories.

- The industry risk premium. It is also known as idiosyncratic risk and can be observed by studying the returns of a group of companies operating in the same industry sector. Morningstar's yearbooks contain empirical data to quantify the risks associated with various industries, grouped by SIC industry code.
- Company specific risk.

Historically, no published data has been available to quantify specific company risks. However, as of late 2006, new research has been able to quantify, or isolate, this risk for publicly traded stocks through the use of total beta calculations. Butler and Pinkerton have outlined a procedure which sets the following two equations together:

Total cost of equity (TCOE) = risk-free rate + total beta * equity risk premium

= risk-free rate + beta * equity risk premium + size premium + company-specific risk premium

The only unknown in the two equations is the company specific risk premium. While it is possible to isolate the company-specific risk premium as shown above, many appraisers just key in on the TCOE provided by the first equation.

It is similar to using the market approach in the income approach instead of adding separate (and potentially redundant) measures of risk in the build-up approach. The use here of total beta, developed by Aswath Damodaran, is a relatively new concept. It is, however, gaining acceptance in the business valuation consultancy community since it is based on modern portfolio theory (although see). Total beta can help appraisers develop a cost of capital who were content to use their intuition alone when previously adding a purely subjective company-specific risk premium in the build-up approach.

This capitalization rate for small, privately held companies is significantly higher than the return that an investor might expect to receive from other common types of investments, such as money market accounts, mutual funds, or even real estate. Those investments involve substantially lower levels of risk than an investment in a closely held company. Depository accounts are insured by the federal government (up to certain limits); mutual funds are composed of publicly traded stocks, for which risk can be substantially minimized through portfolio diversification.

Closely held companies, on the other hand, frequently fail for a variety of reasons too numerous to name. There are no federal guarantees. The risk of investing in a private company cannot be reduced through diversification, and most businesses do not own the type of hard assets that can ensure capital appreciation over time. This is why investors demand a much higher return on their investment in closely held businesses; such investments are inherently much more risky.

=== Asset-based approaches ===
In asset-based analysis the value of a business is equal to the sum of its assets. The values of these assets must be adjusted to fair market value wherever possible. The value of a company's intangible assets, such as goodwill, is generally impossible to determine apart from the company's overall enterprise value (see tangible common equity). For this reason, the asset-based approach is not the most probative method of determining the value of going business concerns. In these cases, the asset-based approach yields a result that is probably less than the fair market value of the business. The asset based approach is the entry barrier value and should preferably be used in businesses having mature or declining growth cycle, and is more suitable for a capital intensive industry.

In considering an asset-based approach, the valuation professional must consider whether the shareholder whose interest is being valued would have any authority to access the value of the assets directly. Shareholders own shares in a corporation, but not its assets, which are owned by the corporation. A controlling shareholder may have the authority to direct the corporation to sell all or part of the assets it owns and to distribute the proceeds to the shareholders. The non-controlling shareholder, however, lacks this authority and cannot access the value of the assets. As a result, the value of a corporation's assets is not the true indicator of value to a shareholder who cannot avail himself of that value.

Adjusted net book value may be the most relevant standard of value where liquidation is imminent or ongoing; where a company earnings or cash flow are nominal, negative or worth less than its assets; or where net book value is standard in the industry in which the company operates. The adjusted net book value may also be used as a "sanity check" when compared to other methods of valuation, such as the income and market approaches.

==== Cultural valuation method ====
Besides mathematical approaches for the valuation of companies a rather unknown method includes also the cultural aspect. The so-called "cultural valuation method" (cultural due diligence) seeks to combine existing knowledge, motivation and internal culture with the results of a net-asset-value method. Especially during a company takeover uncovering hidden problems is of high importance for a later success of the business venture.

=== Market approaches ===
The market approach to business valuation is rooted in the economic principle of competition: that in a free market the supply and demand forces will drive the price of business assets to a certain equilibrium. Buyers would not pay more for the business, and the sellers will not accept less, than the price of a comparable business enterprise. The buyers and sellers are assumed to be equally well informed and acting in their own interests to conclude a transaction. It is similar in many respects to the comparable sales method that is commonly used in real estate appraisal. The market price of the stocks of publicly traded companies engaged in the same or a similar line of business, whose shares are actively traded in a free and open market, can be a valid indicator of value when the transactions in which stocks are traded are sufficiently similar to permit meaningful comparison.

The difficulty lies in identifying public companies that are sufficiently comparable to the subject company for this purpose. Also, as for a private company, the equity is less liquid (in other words its stocks are less easy to buy or sell) than for a public company, its value is considered to be slightly lower than such a valuation based on publicly listed share prices would give.

When there is a lack of comparison with direct competition, a meaningful alternative could be a vertical value-chain approach where the subject company is compared with, for example, a known downstream industry to have a good feel of its value by building useful correlations with its downstream companies. Such comparison often reveals useful insights which help business analysts better understand performance relationship between the subject company and its downstream industry. For example, if a growing subject company is in an industry more concentrated than its downstream industry with a high degree of interdependence, one should logically expect the subject company performs better than the downstream industry in terms of growth, margins and risk.

==== Guideline public company method ====
The guideline public company method entails a comparison of the subject company to publicly traded companies. The comparison is generally based on published data regarding the public companies' stock prices and earnings, sales, or revenues, which is expressed as a fraction known as a multiple. If the guideline public companies are sufficiently similar to each other and the subject company to permit a meaningful comparison, then their multiples should be similar. The public companies identified for comparison purposes should be similar to the subject company in terms of industry, product lines, market, growth, margins and risk.

However, if the subject company is privately owned, its value must be adjusted for lack of marketability. This is usually represented by a discount, or a percentage reduction in the value of the company when compared to its publicly traded counterparts. This reflects the higher risk associated with holding stock in a private company. The difference in value can be quantified by applying a discount for lack of marketability. This discount is determined by studying prices paid for shares of ownership in private companies that eventually offer their stock in a public offering. Alternatively, the lack of marketability can be assessed by comparing the prices paid for restricted shares to fully marketable shares of stock of public companies.

=== Option pricing approaches ===
As above, in certain cases equity may be valued by applying the techniques and frameworks developed for financial options, via a real options framework.

In general, equity may be viewed as a call option on the firm, and this allows for the valuation of troubled firms which may otherwise be difficult to analyse. The classic application of this approach is to the valuation of distressed securities, already discussed in the original Black–Scholes paper. Here, since the principle of limited liability protects equity investors, shareholders would choose not to repay the firm's debt where the value of the firm as perceived is less than the value of the outstanding debt; see bond valuation. Where firm value is greater than debt value, the shareholders would choose to repay (i.e. exercise their option) and not to liquidate. Thus analogous to out the money options which nevertheless have value, equity may have value even if the value of the firm falls well below the face value of the outstanding debt—and this value can be determined using the appropriate option valuation technique.

Certain business situations, and the parent firms in those cases, are also logically analysed under an options framework. Just as a financial option gives its owner the right, but not the obligation, to buy or sell a security at a given price, companies that make strategic investments have the right, but not the obligation, to exploit opportunities in the future; management will of course only exercise where this makes economic sense. Thus, for companies facing uncertainty of this type, the stock price may be seen as the sum of the value of existing businesses (i.e., the discounted cash flow value) plus any real option value. Equity valuations here, may thus proceed likewise.

A common application is to natural resource investments. Here, the value of the asset is a function of both quantity of resource available and the price of the resource in question. The value of the resource is then the difference between the value of the asset and the cost associated with developing the resource. Where positive, "in the money", management will undertake the development, and will not do so otherwise, and a resource project is thus effectively a call option. A resource firm may therefore also be analysed using the options approach. Specifically, the value of the firm comprises the value of already active projects determined via DCF valuation (or other standard techniques) and undeveloped reserves as analysed using the real options framework.

Product patents may also be valued as options, and the value of firms holding these patents—typically firms in the bio-science, technology, and pharmaceutical sectors—can similarly be viewed as the sum of the value of products in place and the portfolio of patents yet to be deployed. As regards the option analysis, since the patent provides the firm with the right to develop the product, it will do so only if the present value of the expected cash flows from the product exceeds the cost of development, and the patent rights thus correspond to a call option. Similar analysis may be applied to options on films (or other works of intellectual property) and the valuation of film studios.

== Discounts and premiums ==
The valuation approaches yield the fair market value of the company as a whole. In valuing a minority, non-controlling interest in a business, however, the valuation professional must consider the applicability of discounts that affect such interests.

Discussions of discounts and premiums frequently begin with a review of the levels of value. There are three common levels of value: controlling interest, marketable minority, and non-marketable minority.

The intermediate level, marketable minority interest, is less than the controlling interest level and higher than the non-marketable minority interest level. The marketable minority interest level represents the perceived value of equity interests that are freely traded without any restrictions. These interests are generally traded on the New York Stock Exchange, AMEX, NASDAQ, and other exchanges where there is a ready market for equity securities. These values represent a minority interest in the subject companies—small blocks of stock that represent less than 50% of the company's equity, and usually much less than 50%.

Controlling interest level is the value that an investor would be willing to pay to acquire more than 50% of a company's stock, thereby gaining the attendant prerogatives of control. Some of the prerogatives of control include: electing directors, hiring and firing the company's management and determining their compensation; declaring dividends and distributions, determining the company's strategy and line of business, and acquiring, selling or liquidating the business. This level of value generally contains a control premium over the intermediate level of value, which typically ranges from 25% to 50%. An additional premium may be paid by strategic investors who are motivated by synergistic motives.

Non-marketable, minority level is the lowest level on the chart, representing the level at which non-controlling equity interests in private companies are generally valued or traded. This level of value is discounted because no ready market exists in which to purchase or sell interests. Private companies are less "liquid" than publicly traded companies, and transactions in private companies take longer and are more uncertain. Between the intermediate and lowest levels of the chart, there are restricted shares of publicly traded companies.

Despite a growing inclination of the IRS and tax courts to challenge valuation discounts, Shannon Pratt suggested in a scholarly presentation recently that valuation discounts are actually increasing as the differences between public and private companies is widening. Publicly traded stocks have grown more liquid in the past decade due to rapid electronic trading, reduced commissions, and governmental deregulation. These developments have not improved the liquidity of interests in private companies, however. Valuation discounts are multiplicative, so they must be considered in order. Control premiums and their inverse, minority interest discounts, are considered before marketability discounts are applied.

=== Discount for lack of control ===
The first discount that must be considered is the discount for lack of control, which in this instance is also a minority interest discount. Minority interest discounts are the inverse of control premiums, to which the following mathematical relationship exists: MID = 1 – [1 / (1 + CP)] The most common source of data regarding control premiums is the Control Premium Study, published annually by Mergerstat since 1972. Mergerstat compiles data regarding publicly announced mergers, acquisitions and divestitures involving 10% or more of the equity interests in public companies, where the purchase price is $1 million or more and at least one of the parties to the transaction is a U.S. entity. Mergerstat defines the "control premium" as the percentage difference between the acquisition price and the share price of the freely traded public shares five days prior to the announcement of the M&A transaction. While it is not without valid criticism, Mergerstat control premium data (and the minority interest discount derived therefrom) is widely accepted within the valuation profession.

=== Discount for lack of marketability ===
A "discount for lack of marketability" (DLOM) may be applied to a minority block of stock to alter the valuation of that block.

Another factor to be considered in valuing closely held companies is the marketability of an interest in such businesses. Marketability is defined as the ability to convert the business interest into cash quickly, with minimum transaction and administrative costs, and with a high degree of certainty as to the amount of net proceeds. There is usually a cost and a time lag associated with locating interested and capable buyers of interests in privately held companies, because there is no established market of readily available buyers and sellers.

All other factors being equal, an interest in a publicly traded company is worth more because it is readily marketable. Conversely, an interest in a privately held company is worth less because no established market exists. The IRS Valuation Guide for Income, Estate and Gift Taxes acknowledges this relationship, stating: "Investors prefer an asset which is easy to sell, that is, liquid."

The discount for lack of control is separate and distinguishable from the discount for lack of marketability. It is the valuation professional's task to quantify the lack of marketability of an interest in a privately held company. Because, in this case, the subject interest is not a controlling interest in the company, and the owner of that interest cannot compel liquidation to convert the subject interest to cash quickly, and no established market exists on which that interest could be sold, the discount for lack of marketability is appropriate.

=== Sustainability and ESG Premiums ===
The growing emphasis on environmental, social, and governance (ESG) factors has influenced valuation, particularly in mergers and acquisitions. Research indicates a non-linear relationship between corporate environmental performance and acquisition premiums, forming an inverted U-shape. Moderate ESG engagement maximizes premiums, while both low and excessive engagement may reduce value due to associated risks and costs. Firms with robust ESG integration may benefit from lower capital costs and stronger investor confidence, further shaping valuation outcomes. Companies with strong ESG engagement also tend to exhibit greater reputational capital and resilience in market downturns.

=== Empirical studies ===
Several empirical studies have been published that attempt to quantify the discount for lack of marketability. These studies include the restricted stock studies and the pre-IPO studies. The aggregate of these studies indicate average discounts of 35% and 50%, respectively. Some experts believe the lack of control and marketability discounts can aggregate discounts for as much as ninety percent of a company's fair market value, specifically with family-owned companies.

==== Restricted stock studies ====
Restricted stocks are equity securities of public companies that are similar in all respects to the freely traded stocks of those companies except that they carry a restriction that prevents them from being traded on the open market for a certain period of time, which is usually one year (two years prior to 1990). This restriction from active trading, which amounts to a lack of marketability, is the only distinction between the restricted stock and its freely traded counterpart. Restricted stock can be traded in private transactions and usually do so at a discount. The restricted stock studies attempt to verify the difference in price at which the restricted shares trade versus the price at which the same unrestricted securities trade in the open market as of the same date. The underlying data by which these studies arrived at their conclusions has not been made public. Consequently, it is not possible when valuing a particular company to compare the characteristics of that company to the study data. Still, the existence of a marketability discount has been recognized by valuation professionals and the courts, and the restricted stock studies are frequently cited as empirical evidence. Notably, the lowest average discount reported by these studies was 26% and the highest average discount was 40%.

==== Option pricing ====
In addition to the restricted stock studies, U.S. publicly traded companies are able to sell stock to offshore investors (SEC Regulation S, enacted in 1990) without registering the shares with the Securities and Exchange Commission. The offshore buyers may resell these shares in the United States, still without having to register the shares, after holding them for just 40 days. Typically, these shares are sold for 20% to 30% below the publicly traded share price. Some of these transactions have been reported with discounts of more than 30%, resulting from the lack of marketability. These discounts are similar to the marketability discounts inferred from the restricted and pre-IPO studies, despite the holding period being just 40 days. Studies based on the prices paid for options have also confirmed similar discounts. If one holds restricted stock and purchases an option to sell that stock at the market price (a put), the holder has, in effect, purchased marketability for the shares. The price of the put is equal to the marketability discount. The range of marketability discounts derived by this study was 32% to 49%. However, ascribing the entire value of a put option to marketability is misleading, because the primary source of put value comes from the downside price protection. A correct economic analysis would use deeply in-the-money puts or single-stock futures, demonstrating that marketability of restricted stock is of low value because it is easy to hedge using unrestricted stock or futures trades.

==== Pre-IPO studies ====
Another approach to measure the marketability discount is to compare the prices of stock offered in initial public offerings (IPOs) to transactions in the same company's stocks prior to the IPO. Companies that are going public are required to disclose all transactions in their stocks for a period of three years prior to the IPO. The pre-IPO studies are the leading alternative to the restricted stock stocks in quantifying the marketability discount.

The pre-IPO studies are sometimes criticized because the sample size is relatively small, the pre-IPO transactions may not be arm's length, and the financial structure and product lines of the studied companies may have changed during the three year pre-IPO window.

==== Applying the studies ====
The studies confirm what the marketplace knows intuitively: Investors covet liquidity and loathe obstacles that impair liquidity. Prudent investors buy illiquid investments only when there is a sufficient discount in the price to increase the rate of return to a level which brings risk-reward back into balance. The referenced studies establish a reasonable range of valuation discounts from the mid-30%s to the low 50%s. The more recent studies appeared to yield a more conservative range of discounts than older studies, which may have suffered from smaller sample sizes. Another method of quantifying the lack of marketability discount is the quantifying marketability discounts model (QMDM).

== See also ==
- Consolidation (business)
- Corporate finance:
  - Mergers and acquisitions § Business valuation
  - Corporate finance § Investment and project valuation.
- Divestment
- Economic value added
- EV/EBITDA
- Fairness opinion
- Goodwill (accounting)
- Intangible asset
- Market value added
- Mergers and acquisitions
- Patent valuation
- P/E ratio
- Price/sales ratio
- Residual income valuation
- Tax amortization benefit
- Valuation using discounted cash flows
- Valuation using multiples
- Valuation using the Market Penetration Model
