= Tax amortization benefit =

Savings resulting from amortization

In accounting, tax amortization benefit (or tax amortisation benefit) refers to the present value of income tax savings resulting from the tax deduction generated by the amortization of an intangible asset.

== Intangible asset valuation ==
When the purchaser of an intangible asset is allowed to amortize the price of the asset as an expense for tax purposes, the value of the asset is enhanced by this tax amortization benefit. Specifically, the fair market value of the asset is increased by the present value of the future tax savings derived from the tax amortization of the asset. The present value of these savings is to be estimated and included as a part of the fair market value when valuing an intangible asset.

== Circularity of the tax amortization benefit ==
The present value of the future tax savings is a mathematical function of the fair market value. This creates circularity, because the fair market value includes the present value of the tax savings. This circularity can be handled using a two-step procedure consisting in estimating the value of the intangible asset in the absence of the tax amortization benefit first and then grossing up the previous value by a tax amortization benefit factor.

$$FMV\,=\,{VBAB * TAB_{factor}}$$

where

1. FMV is the fair market value of the intangible asset
2. VBAB is the value of the intangible asset before amortization benefits
3. TAB factor is the result of the formula defined below

== Tax amortization benefit factor ==
The tax amortization benefit factor (or TAB factor) is the result of a mathematical function of a corporate tax rate, a discount rate and a tax amortization period:

$$TAB_{factor}\,=\,{1 \over [1-{t \over n}*({1 \over k}-{1 \over (k*(1+k)^n)})]}$$

where

1. TAB factor is the value assuming end-year discounting
2. t is the corporate tax rate applicable to the future amortization of the asset
3. n is the tax amortization period of the asset in years
4. k is the discount rate

The corporate tax rate as well as the tax amortization period are defined by country-specific tax legislations. The tax amortization period might be different from the useful life used in accounting. For example, while trademarks can have an indefinite useful life for accounting purposes, the tax legislation of the United States establishes a mandatory 15-year amortization period for trademarks.

== See also ==
- Amortization (accounting)
- Business valuation
- Business valuation standard
- Intellectual property valuation
- Purchase price allocation

== Sources ==
- The Canadian Institute of Chartered Business Valuators. Illustrative Example of Intangible Asset Valuation. 2009.
