= Business valuation standard =

Codes of practice used in business valuation

Business Valuation Standards (BVS) are codes of practice that are used in business valuation. Examples of business appraisal standards are as follows:

- CVA Professional Standards published by the National Association of Certified Valuators and Analysts.
- CICBV Practice Standards. Published by the CBV Institute.
- Uniform Standards of Professional Appraisal Practice (USPAP). Standards 9 and 10 cover business valuation and reporting standards. Published by the Appraisal Foundation.
- International Valuation Standards. Published by the International Valuation Standards Council.
- Statement on Standards for Valuation Services (SSVS No 1). Published by the American Institute of CPAs.

A comparison of global standards for NACVA, GACVA, IVSC, RICS, and CBV was published on 1 June 2023.

In addition, each of the three major United States valuation societies—the American Society of Appraisers (ASA), American Institute of Certified Public Accountants (CPA/ABV), and the National Association of Certified Valuators and Analysts (NACVA)—has its own set of Business Valuation Guidelines, which it requires all of its accredited members to adhere to. The AICPA's standards are published as Statement on Standards for Valuation Services No.1 and the ASA's guidelines are published as the ASA Business Valuation Guidelines, which largely follow the USPAP Standard requirements. All AICPA members are required to follow SSVS1. Additionally, the majority of the State Accountancy Boards have adopted VS Section 100 for CPAs licensed in their state.

== Features ==
All of the standards have the following in common:

A requirement of independence
The appraiser must not act in favor of the client or any other party.
A requirement that fees be not contingent on appraised value
Fees based upon, for example, a percentage of the valuation are unethical and are not allowed.
A requirement that all limiting conditions be explicitly stated
The reader must be informed of all assumptions made as part of the valuation. For example, if a lawsuit is pending against a business, the valuation must explicitly state that the impact of the outcome of the lawsuit will have an unknown effect on the value, and what assumptions about the outcome have or have not been made.
A requirement that all people participating in the valuation be disclosed
All professionals participating in a valuation report must sign it, and must have certification of their independence, fee arrangements, and other factors.
A requirement that all information sources be stated
Readers must be able to replicate valuation reports for themselves. Therefore, all sources used in compiling the report must be stated.
Minimum requirements for contents of reports
The precise minimum requirements vary from society to society, but roughly they include the purpose and scope of the assignment, the standard of value and specific valuation date being employed, an identification of the specific interest being evaluated, the relevant state and federal laws that govern the entity being valued, the scope of the procedures employed during valuation, the nature and history of the business, the historical financial information on the business, a thorough financial analysis of the business comparing the business's performance with industry trends, an overview of the industry in which the business operates and the impact of market conditions on the business, and the current investment climate.

== Concepts employed ==
This is a list of some of the common concepts employed in business valuation that are defined by business valuation standards.

Marketability discount
In the ASA BVS, a marketability discount is "an amount or percentage deducted from an equity interest to reflect lack of marketability"

== Standards and Premises of Business Valuation ==
Before the value of a business can be measured, the valuation assignment must specify the reason and circumstances accompanying the business valuation. These are formally known as the business value standard and the value premise. The purchase or sale of a business is not just a transaction; it is a strategic step that can significantly impact financial future and career path. Therefore, it is important to conduct the valuation correctly according to the purpose.

The value standard is the hypothetical conditions under which the business will be valued. The value premise refers to assumptions, such as the assumption that the business will continue indefinitely in its current form (going concern) or that the value of the business lies in the proceeds from selling all its assets minus the associated liabilities (sum of the parts or aggregate asset value of the business). When done properly, the valuation should reflect the ability of the business to meet specific market demand, since this is the only true predictor of future cash flows.

Value Standards

- Fair Market Value — the value of a commercial enterprise determined between a willing buyer and a willing seller, both fully informed of all relevant facts, and neither compelled to conclude the transaction.
- Investment Value — the value of a company for a specific investor. The effect of synergy is included in the valuation under the investment value standard.
- Intrinsic Value — a measure of the business's value that reflects the investor's deep understanding of the company's economic potential.

In business valuation, three different approaches are commonly used: the income approach, the asset-based approach, and the market approach. Within each of these approaches, there are various methods for determining the business's value using a value definition appropriate for the valuation assignment.
