= Valuation using multiples =

Process in Economics

In economics, valuation using multiples, or "relative valuation", is a process that consists of:

- identifying comparable assets (the peer group) and obtaining market values for these assets.
- converting these market values into standardized values relative to a key statistic, since the absolute prices cannot be compared. This process of standardizing creates valuation multiples.
- applying the valuation multiple to the key statistic of the asset being valued, controlling for any differences between asset and the peer group that might affect the multiple.

Multiples analysis is one of the oldest methods of analysis. It was well understood in the 1800s and widely used by U.S. courts during the 20th century, although it has recently declined as Discounted Cash Flow and more direct market-based methods have become more popular. "Comparable company analysis", closely related, was introduced by economists at Harvard Business School in the 1930s.

== Valuation multiples ==
A valuation multiple is simply an expression of market value of an asset relative to a key statistic that is assumed to relate to that value. To be useful, that statistic – whether earnings, cash flow or some other measure – must bear a logical relationship to the market value observed; to be seen, in fact, as the driver of that market value.

Other commonly used multiples are based on the enterprise value of a company, such as (EV/EBITDA, EV/EBIT, EV/NOPAT). These multiples reveal the rating of a business independently of its capital structure, and are of particular interest in mergers, acquisitions and transactions on private companies.

Not all multiples are based on earnings or cash flow drivers. The price-to-book ratio (P/B) is a commonly used benchmark comparing market value to the accounting book value of the firm's assets. The price/sales ratio and EV/sales ratios measure value relative to sales. These multiples must be used with caution as both sales and book values are less likely to be value drivers than earnings.

Less commonly, valuation multiples may be based on non-financial industry-specific value drivers, such as enterprise value / number of subscribers for cable or telecoms businesses or enterprise value / audience numbers for a broadcasting company. In real estate valuations, the sales comparison approach often makes use of valuation multiples based on the surface areas of the properties being valued.

== Peer group ==
A peer group is a set of companies or assets which are selected as being sufficiently comparable to the company or assets being valued (usually by virtue of being in the same industry or by having similar characteristics in terms of earnings growth and/or return on investment).

In practice, no two businesses are alike, and analysts will often make adjustment to the observed multiples in order to attempt to harmonize the data into a more comparable format. These adjustments may be based on a number of factors, including:

- Industrial / business environment factors: Business model, industry, geography, seasonality, inflation
- Accounting factors: Accounting policies, financial year end
- Financial: Capital structure
- Empirical factors: Size

These adjustments can involve the use of regression analysis against different potential value drivers and are used to test correlations between the different value drivers. Such methods can significantly improve valuation accuracy.

When the peer group consists of public quoted companies, this type of valuation is also often described as comparable company analysis (or "comps", "peer group analysis", "equity comps", " trading comps", or "public market multiples"). When the peer group consists of companies or assets that have been acquired in mergers or acquisitions, this type of valuation is described as precedent transaction analysis (or "transaction comps", "deal comps", or "private market multiples").

== Advantages/disadvantages of multiples ==
=== Disadvantages ===
There are a number of criticisms levied against multiples, but in the main these can be summarised as:

- Simplistic: A multiple is a distillation of a great deal of information into a single number or series of numbers. By combining many value drivers into a point estimate, multiples may make it difficult to disaggregate the effect of different drivers, such as growth, on value. The danger is that this encourages simplistic – and possibly erroneous – interpretation.
- Static: A multiple represents a snapshot of where a firm is at a point in time, but fails to capture the dynamic and ever-evolving nature of business and competition.
- Difficulties in comparisons: Multiples are primarily used to make comparisons of relative value. But comparing multiples is an exacting art form, because there are so many reasons that multiples can differ, not all of which relate to true differences in value. For example, different accounting policies can result in diverging multiples for otherwise identical operating businesses.
- Dependence on correctly valued peers: The use of multiples only reveals patterns in relative values, not absolute values such as those obtained from discounted cash flow valuations. If the peer group as a whole is incorrectly valued (such as may happen during a stock market "bubble") then the resulting multiples will also be misvalued.
- Short-term: Multiples are based on historic data or near-term forecasts. Valuations based on multiples will therefore fail to capture differences in projected performance over the longer term, and will have difficulty correctly valuing cyclical industries unless somewhat subjective normalization adjustments are made.

=== Advantages ===
Despite these disadvantages, multiples have several advantages.

- Usefulness: Valuation is about judgment, and multiples provide a framework for making value judgements. When used properly, multiples are robust tools that can provide useful information about relative value.
- Simplicity: Their very simplicity and ease of calculation makes multiples an appealing and user-friendly method of assessing value. Multiples can help the user avoid the potentially misleading precision of other, more 'precise' approaches such as discounted cash flow valuation or EVA, which can create a false sense of comfort.
- Relevance: Multiples focus on the key statistics that other investors use. Since investors in aggregate move markets, the most commonly used statistics and multiples will have the most impact.

These factors, and the existence of wide-ranging comparables, help explain the enduring use of multiples by investors despite the rise of other methods.

== Comparison of commonly used valuation multiples ==
=== Equity price based multiples ===
Equity price based multiples are most relevant where investors acquire minority positions in companies. Care should be used when comparing companies with very different capital structures. Different debt levels will affect equity multiples because of the gearing effect of debt. In addition, equity multiples will not explicitly take into account balance sheet risk.

Multiple	Definition	Advantages	Disadvantages
P/E ratio	Share price / Earnings per share (EPS) EPS is net income/weighted average no of shares in issue EPS may be adjusted to eliminate exceptional items (core EPS) and/or outstanding dilutive elements (fully diluted EPS)	Most commonly used equity multiple; Data availability is high	EPS can be subject to differences in accounting policies and manipulation; Unless adjusted, can be subject to one-off exceptional items; Cannot be used if earnings are negative
Price / cash earnings	Share price / earnings per share plus depreciation amortization and changes in non-cash provisions	Cash earnings are a rough measure of cash flow; Unaffected by differences in accounting for depreciation	Incomplete treatment of cash flow; Usually used as a supplement to other measures if accounting differences are material
Price / book ratio	Share price / book value per share	Can be useful where assets are a core driver of earnings such as capital-intensive industries; Most widely used in valuing financial companies, such as banks, because banks have to report accurate book values of their loans and deposits, and liquidation value is equal to book value since deposits and loans are liquidated at same value as reported book values.	Book values for tangible assets are stated at historical cost, which is not a reliable indicator of economic value; Book value for tangible assets can be significantly impacted by differences in accounting policies
PEG ratio	Prospective PE ratio / prospective average earnings growth	Most suitable when valuing high growth companies	Requires credible forecasts of growth; Can understate the higher risk associated with many high-growth stocks
Dividend yield	Dividend per share / share price	Useful for comparing cash returns with types of investments; Can be used to establish a floor price for a stock	Dependent on distribution policy of the company; Yield to investor is subject to differences in taxation between jurisdictions; Assumes the dividend is sustainable
Price / Sales	Share price / sales per share	Easy to calculate; Can be applied to loss making firms; Less susceptible to accounting differences than other measures	Mismatch between nominator and denominator in formula (EV/Sales is a more appropriate measure); Not used except in very broad, quick approximations

=== Enterprise value based multiples ===
Enterprise value based multiples are particularly relevant in mergers & acquisitions where the whole of the company's stock and liabilities are acquired. Certain multiples such as EV/EBITDA are also a useful complements to valuations of minority interests, especially when the P/E ratio is difficult to interpret because of significant differences in capital structures, in accounting policies or in cases where net earnings are negative or low.

Multiple	Definition	Advantages	Disadvantages
EV/Sales	Enterprise value / net sales	Least susceptible to accounting differences; Remains applicable even when earnings are negative or highly cyclical	A crude measure as sales are rarely a direct value driver
EV/EBITDAR	Enterprise value / Earnings before Interest, Tax, Depreciation & Amortization and Rental Costs	Proxy for operating free cash flows; Attempts to normalize capital intensity between companies that choose to rent rather than own their core assets; Most often used in the transport, hotel and retail industries	Rental costs may not be reported and need to be estimated; Ignores variations in capital expenditure and depreciation; Ignores value creation through tax management
EV/EBITDA	Enterprise value / Earnings before Interest, Tax, Depreciation & Amortization. Also excludes movements in non-cash provisions and exceptional items	EBITDA is a proxy for free cash flows; Probably the most popular of the EV based multiples; Unaffected by depreciation policy	Ignores variations in capital expenditure and depreciation; Ignores potential value creation through tax management
EV/EBIT and EV/EBITA	Enterprise value / Earnings before interest and taxes (and Amortisation)	Better allows for differences in capital intensiveness compared to EBITDA by incorporating maintenance capital expenditure	Susceptible to differences in depreciation policy; Ignores potential value creation through tax management
EV/NOPLAT	Enterprise value / Net Operating Profit After Adjusted Tax	NOPLAT incorporates a number of adjustments to better reflect operating profitability	NOPLAT adjustments can be complicated and are not applied consistently by different analysts
EV/opFCF	Enterprise value / Operating Free Cash Flow OpFCF is core EBITDA less estimated normative capital expenditure requirement and estimated normative variation in working capital requirement	Better allows for differences in capital intensiveness compared to EBITDA; Less susceptible to accounting differences than EBIT; Use of estimates allows for smoothing of irregular real capital expenditures	Introduces additional subjectivity in estimates of capital expenditure
EV/ Enterprise FCF	Enterprise value / Free cash flow Enterprise FCF is core EBITDA less actual capital expenditure requirement and actual increase in working capital requirement	Less subjective than opFCF; Better allows for differences in capital intensiveness compared to EBITDA; Less susceptible to accounting differences than EBIT	Can be volatile and difficult to interpret as capital expenditure is often irregular and “lumpy”
EV/Invested Capital	Enterprise value / Invested capital	Can be useful where assets are a core driver of earnings, such as for capital-intensive industries	Book values for tangible assets are stated at historical cost, which is not a reliable indicator of economic value; Book value for tangible assets can be significantly impacted by differences in accounting policies
EV/Capacity Measure	Depends on industry (e.g. EV/subscribers, EV/production capacity, EV/audience)	Not susceptible to accounting differences; Remains applicable even when earnings are negative or highly cyclical	A crude measure as capacity measures are rarely a direct value driver

== Example (discounted forward PE ratio method) ==
=== Mathematics ===

Condition: Peer company is profitable.

Rf = discount rate during the last forecast year

tf = last year of the forecast period.

C = correction factor

P = current stock Price

NPP = net profit peer company

NPO = net profit of target company after forecast period

S = number of shares

=== Process data diagram ===
The following diagram shows an overview of the process of company valuation using multiples. All activities in this model are explained in more detail in section 3: Using the multiples method.

=== Using the multiples method ===
==== Determine forecast period ====
Determine the year after which the company value is to be known.

Example:

'VirusControl' is an ICT startup that has just finished their business plan. Their goal is to provide professionals with software for simulating virus outbreaks. Their only investor is required to wait for 5 years before making an exit. Therefore, VirusControl is using a forecast period of 5 years.

==== Identifying peer company ====
Search the (stock)market for companies most comparable to the target company. From the investor perspective, a peer universe can also contain companies that are not only direct product competitors but are subject to similar cycles, suppliers and other external factors (e.g. a door and a window manufacturer may be considered peers as well).

Important characteristics include: operating margin, company size, products, customer segmentation, growth rate, cash flow, number of employees, etc.

Example:

VirusControl has identified 4 other companies similar to itself.

- Medical Sim
- Global Plan
- Virus Solutions
- PM Software

==== Determining correct price earning ratio (P/E) ====
The price earnings ratio (P/E) of each identified peer company can be calculated as long as they are profitable. The P/E is calculated as:

P/E = Current stock price / (Net profit / Weighted average number of shares)

Particular attention is paid to companies with P/E ratios substantially higher or lower than the peer group. A P/E far below the average can mean (among other reasons) that the true value of a company has not been identified by the market, that the business model is flawed, or that the most recent profits include, for example, substantial one-off items. Companies with P/E ratios substantially different from the peers (the outliers) can be removed or other corrective measures used to avoid this problem.

Example:

P/E ratio of companies similar to VirusControl:

	Current Stock Price	Net profit	Number of Shares	P/E
Medical Sim	€16.32	€1,000,000	1,100,000	17.95
Global Plan	€19.50	€1,800,000	2,000,000	21.7
Virus Solutions	€6.23	€3,000,000	10,000,000	20.8
PM Software	€12.97	€4,000,000	2,000,000	6.5

One company, PM Software, has substantially lower P/E ratio than the others. Further market research shows that PM Software has recently acquired a government contract to supply the military with simulating software for the next three years. Therefore, VirusControl decides to discard this P/E ratio and only use the values of 17.95, 21.7 and 20.8.

==== Determining future company value ====
The value of the target company after the forecast period can be calculated by:

Average corrected P/E ratio * net profit at the end of the forecast period.

Example:

VirusControl is expecting a net profit at the end of the fifth year of about €2.2 million. They use the following calculation to determine their future value:

((17.95 + 21.7 + 20.8) / 3) * 2,200,000 = €44.3 million

==== Determining discount rate / factor ====
Determine the appropriate discount rate and factor for the last year of the forecast period based on the risk level associated with the target company

Example:

VirusControl has chosen their discount rate very high as their company is potentially very profitable but also very risky. They calculate their discount factor based on five years.

Risk Rate	50%
Discount Rate	50%
Discount Factor	0.1316

==== Determining current company value ====
Calculate the current value of the future company value by multiplying the future business value with the discount factor. This is known as the time value of money.

Example:

VirusControl multiplies their future company value with the discount factor:

44,300,000 * 0.1316 = 5,829,880 The company or equity value of VirusControl: €5.83 million

== See also ==
- market-based valuation
- relative valuation
- Outline of finance § Relative valuation
