= CBV Institute =

Canadian business valuation organization

CBV Institute / L’Institut des CBV
- Formation: 1971
- Type: not-for-profit organization
- Headquarters: Toronto, Canada
- Coordinates: 43°38′40.51″N 79°23′28.65″W
- Region served: Canada
- Members: ▲2,742 (2025)
- Official language: English, French
- President & CEO: Christine Sawchuk
- Board Chair: Chris Polson
- Revenue: ▼ C$4.86 million (2025)
- Expenses: ▲ C$4.98 million (2025)
- Staff: 12 (2025)
- Students: ▲1,436 (2025)
- Website: https://cbvinstitute.com/
- Formerly called: Canadian Institute of Chartered Business Valuators (CICBV)

The CBV Institute (French: L’Institut des CBV), formerly known as the Canadian Institute of Chartered Business Valuators (CICBV), is a Canadian business valuation organization. The CBV Institute is a not-for-profit valuation professional organization that establishes the practice standards, educational requirements, and ethical guidelines for its members.

The Chartered Business Valuator (CBV) (French: Experts en Evaluation d’Entreprises (EEE)) designation is a credential for business valuation professionals in Canada. CBVs are governed by The Canadian Institute of Chartered Business Valuators. CBVs quantify the value of a business, its securities, or its intangible assets. CBVs use a variety of valuation methodologies to arrive at a conclusion, and explain their approach, methodology and conclusions in an easy to understand manner. Various approaches used include asset-based approaches (liquidation, adjusted net book value), return-based approaches (capitalized earnings, capitalized cash flows, discounted cash flows), and market-based approaches (comparable company multiples). In the context of litigation, CBVs quantify the damages or losses arising in a legal dispute.

== History ==
The CBV Institute was founded in 1971 by 28 valuation professionals under the leadership of George Ovens. At the time, the introduction of taxation of capital gains in Canada facilitated the general need for business valuation.

== Education requirements ==
After completing the institute's comprehensive Program of Studies (which includes six courses dealing with business valuation, Canadian taxation, the law, and litigation support), completion of the Membership Qualification Exam (held annually), and obtaining practical experience requirements, candidates are then admitted to the membership.

Students must take four courses as part of their education requirements:

- Level I – Introductory Business Valuation
- Level II – Intermediate Business Valuation
- Level III – Advanced Business Valuation
- Level IV – Special Topics in Business Valuation

and pick two electives from the following:

- Valuation for Financial Reporting
- Litigation Support in Business Valuation
- Corporate Finance
- Mergers and Acquisitions (formerly Private Investments)

Students must also pass the Foundations of Financial Modeling program from Financial Modeling Institute, offered free of charge to CBV Institute Registered Students.

CBVs also have continuing professional development requirements. The Institute supports this requirement by organizing various webinars, regional workshops and national conferences that address current and evolving industry topics. CBVs are required to adhere to the Standard of Professional Practice as well as its Code of Conduct and Code of Ethics.

=== Course exemptions ===
The Institute grants various advanced standings to other organizations and university education partners:

- CAIA Association: CAIA members in good standing that have passed the Level I and Level II of the Chartered Alternative Investment Analyst (CAIA) program of studies are exempt from the requirement to complete two elective courses.
- CFA Institute: Individuals who have passed the Level I, Level II and Level III exams of the Chartered Financial Analyst Program are exempt from the requirement to complete two elective courses.
- CPA Canada:
  - Students who chose "Finance" in the Professional Education Program (PEP) as an elective are exempt from Level I.
  - Individuals who complete the two-part Valuation for Financial Reporting (VFR) certificate that is jointly offered by CPA Canada and CBV Institute will receive an exemption from CBV Institute’s Valuation for Financial Reporting elective course.
- American Society of Appraisers: ASA-BV designation holders are exempt from Level I, Level II, and Level III.
- University of Waterloo School of Accounting and Finance: Master of Accounting (MAcc) students who have passed the ACC606 Business Valuations course are exempt from Level I and Level II.

== Partnerships ==
CBV Institute forms various partnerships and relationships with organizations in Canada and the world to develop the business valuation profession and expand the CBV's international presence, including the following:

- International Valuation Standards Council (IVSC)
- International Institute of Business Valuers (IIBV)
- CPA Canada: co-host the "Valuation for Financial Report" (VFR) certificate with CBV Institute.
- American Institute of Certified Public Accountants (AICPA), for its ABV designation.

== See also ==
- American Society of Appraisers
- Business valuation
- Business valuation standard
- List of international professional associations
