= Relative valuation =

Comparing the price of an asset

Relative valuation also called valuation using multiples is the notion of comparing the price of an asset to the market value of similar assets. In the field of securities investment, the idea has led to important practical tools, which could presumably spot pricing anomalies. These tools have subsequently become instrumental in enabling analysts and investors to make vital decisions on asset allocation.

== Equities ==
In equities, the concept separates into two areas—one pertaining to individual equities and the other to indices.

=== Individual equities ===
The most common method for individual equities is based on comparing certain financial ratios or multiples, such as the price to book value, price to earnings, EV/EBITDA, etc., of the equity in question to those of its peers. This type of approach, which is popular as a strategic tool in the financial industry, is mainly statistical and based on historical data.

=== Equity indexes ===
For an equity index the above fails mainly because it is difficult to group indices into peer groups. Consequently, relative valuation here is generally carried out by comparing a national or industry stock index's performance to the economic and market fundamentals of the related industry or country.

Those fundamentals may include GDP growth, interest rate and inflation forecasts, as well as earnings growth, among others. This style of comparison is popular among practising economists in their attempt to rationalise the connections between the equity markets and the economy.

National equity index are not fully relevant in this respect due to the proportion of multinational companies listed in most national stock markets.

== Bonds ==
In valuing a bond, the bond in question will be priced relative to a benchmark, usually a Government bond. Here, the "required return" - technically the yield to maturity or YTM - on the bond is determined based on the bond's Credit rating relative to a government security with similar maturity. The better the quality of the bond, the smaller the spread between its YTM and the YTM of the benchmark. See Bond valuation# Relative price approach.

== See also ==
- Market-based valuation
- Valuation using multiples
- Outline of finance#Relative valuation
