= Economics of patents =

Economic study of patents

Patents are legal instruments intended to encourage innovation by providing a limited monopoly to the inventor (or their assignee) in return for the disclosure of the invention. The underlying assumption is that innovation is encouraged because an inventor can secure exclusive rights and, therefore, a higher probability of financial rewards for their product in the marketplace or the opportunity to profit from licensing the rights to others. The publication of the invention is mandatory to get a patent. Keeping the same invention as a trade secret rather than disclosing it in a patent publication, for some inventions, could prove valuable well beyond the limited time of any patent term but at the risk of unpermitted disclosure or congenial invention by a third party.

== Costs, benefits, risks of the patent system to the public ==
The patent system is designed to encourage innovation. This is because patents, by conferring rights on the owner to exclude competitors from the market, presumably offer the incentive for people to study new technology.

In some fields, particularly pharmaceuticals, it is also argued that the monopoly of the patent in the market allows the owner to recover the huge expenses invested in the research and development phase.

While patent offices in the economically advanced world have numerous procedures in effect to determine the validity and proper scope of a patent application, nevertheless some patents still issue that are not an advance on the existing state-of-the-art, or would otherwise be invalid if challenged. The system corrects these mistakes by maintaining the right to nullify inappropriately issued patents. However, in part because of high litigation costs, only a very small fraction of patent disputes ever go to court. A study in 2005 showed that among 200,000 patents that are issued every year, only 1.5 percent of patents are ever litigated, and only 0.1 percent of patents are ever litigated to trial. This means the majority of patent disputes are either overlooked or settled privately. While private settlement is a cost-effective way to balance the commercial interests of two firms, the public does not benefit from it. Because of the private nature of such settlements, there is no open discussion that would clarify the scope of rights under a particular patent and the opportunity to invalidate the patent is lost. Other competitors do not benefit, and costs across the industry are not reduced.

=== Economics of probabilistic patents ===
Economists Mark Lemley and Carl Shapiro argued that the patent granting process should be rethought because there are inherent uncertainties with the system. Uncertainty in patents can be found in the two fundamental dimensions:

1. uncertainty about the commercial significance of the invention being patented
2. uncertainty about the validity and scope of the legal right being granted.

Modeling patents as probabilistic rights is helpful in assessing the social costs of the system while continuing to encourage innovation and technology dissemination.

== Macroeconomic perspective ==
More U.S. utility patents have been issued in the most recent thirty years than in the first 200 years in which they were issued (1790–1990).

The patent system affects the economy as a whole. The benefits of new results, once the research is publicly known, are available to all in the relevant field, thereby bringing advantages to all parties in that field, though reducing the direct return to the party performing the pioneering research. This reduces economic incentive for a party to conduct research and innovate.

The effects of patents on a given market may vary widely according to the type of market, and whether there are other barriers to entry (e.g., business methods versus regulated medications).

Even in socialist monopole economies, the adherence to international patent laws was or becomes strict, as the effect is reciprocal for public economy, as soon as the level of technology development in these economies creates comparable advantage.

However, since patents essentially encourage innovation by giving owners the right to monopolize the market for a limited time, the public will suffer from the patents that are not innovative by paying a supracompetitive cost.

Another dilemma regarding the patent system's effectiveness is that if the validity and scope were unclear at the issuance, it will always be corrected because other competitors will cause the case to the court and then we could either reevaluate the scope through discussion or invalidate the patent for public good. However, studies of the USPTO data showed that only very few patents are litigated to trial.

Farrell and Merges (2004) pointed out that two reasons have kept individual firms accused of patent infringement from challenging the patent's holders. The first one is the public good problem, which means that once the patent is nullified, the competitors of the accused firm will benefit from the outcome. The other reason is that in many cases they can pass-through the uniform royalty costs in the form of higher prices.

== Microeconomic perspective ==
The economics surrounding a single patent, or group of patents, revolves around the balance between the expense of maintaining the patent(s), and the income derived from owning that/those patents. Similarly the economics of whether to seek a patent present similar concerns with the added up-front costs of obtaining the patent.

The grant of a patent provides the inventor temporarily with an exclusive legal right, thereby securing a means to redeem the costs of research (by charging a higher price for its invention or by license fees from others who wish to practice it).

A patent is an exclusionary right – preventing others from entering the market – and so its effect may be to increase the patent proprietor's income from that market. The major economic effect is the exclusivity period of the patent rights, when exploitation pays back for the enterprise that funded research and development. However, patenting alone does not guarantee for marketing success.

The right to exclude others from entering market with copies is, however, potentially extremely valuable as it can mean total exclusivity in that market for the duration of the patent (generally 20 years from filing). For example, worldwide sales of a patented pharmaceutical can be millions of dollars per day, whereas the generic equivalent would later sell for less than half the price.

Income improvement from a patent is difficult to measure. One may attempt to measure the difference in price between an "improved" product and its "unimproved" counterpart, or compare the price of the product with that in markets where (or when) it has not been patented. More directly measurable income is that which is received from the licensing or sale of patent rights, or from successful litigation of infringement.

== Innovation ==
Under traditional patent doctrine, innovation is spurred by patent law in at least two ways. (1) The inventor can secure exclusive rights, and therefore working on innovation gives the inventor a higher probability of financial rewards in the market place. (2) Publishing the invention, rather than keeping it a trade secret allows others to build upon the technology. Both of these have been challenged based upon economic analysis. The "rewards" theory has been criticized as ignoring the risky prospective nature of the "reward", and the post patent costs of cost-engineering and marketing. The "publication of the patent as spurring innovation" branch has been criticized indicating that it produces patent thickets and encouraging others to design around existing technology rather than to build upon it.

As early as 1986, empirical research into the effect of patent law on innovation found "its effects in this regard are very small in most of the industries we studied". In 2013, Boldrin and Levine concluded that "while patents can have a partial equilibrium effect of improving incentives to invent, the general equilibrium effect on innovation can be negative." Other patent modeling research suggests that rather than encouraging innovation, patents can hinder development, lower R&D investments, and decrease overall economic output.

== Patent valuation ==
Patents are not intrinsically valuable, in the sense that a patent is not economically an "end in itself." Rather, a patent claiming an invention with market demand would likely have economic value because the patent holder can exclude others from making, importing, using, and offering for sale, or selling that invention throughout the jurisdiction (the US for example) and sell the product at a monopoly price. Without alternative suppliers for the patented good or technology, the price the patentee is able to charge would likely be greater than the competitive price (the price in a competitive equilibrium). This portion of incremental profit would only be attributable to the patent and would therefore be the value of the patent.

Patent value, like value of other property, may fluctuate over time, as markets change. What was once a pioneering invention may be soon outsold by an unpatented (and non-infringing) competitor catering to fringe adopters with products having features even more desirable than the invention. Contrarily, a strong patent grip could stagnate a narrow market as innovation is no longer justified, eventually resulting in reduced demand (for outmoded and over-priced products), and thus reduced patent value, as the market moves away.

A particularly difficult question of value arises where inventors/owners use their patents to extract other advantages without actually marketing the invention (e.g., cross-licensing of related patents to avoid litigation, or suppressing a technology that could compete with the owner's other products). How can one determine the value of a patented product (and the underlying patent) that has not actually been produced, let alone sold in any quantity? Furthermore, many products incorporate numerous patented inventions (owned or licensed), and may carry exclusive trademarks, making it difficult to attribute a specific value to an individual patent. Would the same invention be as valuable if owned and marketed under a weak brand?

In 2005, the European Commission published a comprehensive study of the value of patents for patent owners as well as for the European economy. The study was in part based on a survey of 20,000 patent owners who applied for EPO patents between 1993 and 1997. The survey was performed in 2003. 9000 patent owners responded. The patent owners were asked how much effort was required to produce their inventions and how much monetary value their patents had been worth. The median effort to create the patentable invention was 1 person-year, with 10% of the patent owners requiring 2 or more person-years. The median value of the patents produced was €300,000, with 10% of patent owners reporting values of €10 million Euros or more.

In certain cases, patents may be valued using the techniques developed for financial options, as applied via a real options framework. The key parallel is that a patent provides its owner the right to exclude others from using the underlying invention, so both patents and stock options represent a right to exploit an asset in the future, and to exclude others from using it. The patent (option) will have value to the buyer (owner) only to the extent that the expected price in the future exceeds the opportunity cost of earning just as much in a risk-less alternative. Thus patent rights can be thought of as corresponding to a call option and may be valued accordingly. See Option pricing approaches under Business valuation for further discussion.

== See also ==
- Software patent debate
- Prizes as an alternative to patents
- Intellectual property valuation
