= IRunway =

iRunway
- Type: Private
- Industry: Technology Consulting; Intellectual Property Services
- Founded: 2006
- Headquarters: Bangalore, India
- Number of locations: Austin, Texas; Palo Alto, California; Bangalore, India
- Key people: Ravindra Upadrashta (CEO); Animesh Kumar (CSO); Shashank Kabra (COO)
- Services: Patent Litigation Support; Portfolio Analysis; Technology Research and Due Diligence
- Website: www.i-runway.com

iRunway is a boutique technology, finance and litigation consulting firm.

== History ==
iRunway was founded in 2006 by Ravi Upadrashta, Animesh Kumar, Kunal Sharma and Shashank Kabra.

== Notable Trials ==
Versata vs. SAP - In 2009, the jury awarded Versata $138.6 million in damages - the 4th highest patent jury verdict in the US that year.
