= IP economics =

Branch of information economics

Intellectual property (IP) economics is a branch of information economics that studies how intellectual property rights (IPRs)—such as patents, copyrights, trademarks, and trade secrets—affect economic behavior, innovation, and markets. It tries to understand how best to structure policies surrounding IP to maximize social welfare.

Intellectual property seeks to balance incentives for creators and innovators to produce new ideas and products with the broader public interest in accessing knowledge and innovations. By granting temporary monopolies through IPRs, governments seek to encourage investment in research and development (R&D) by allowing innovators to earn financial benefits from their creations. However, these monopolies can also lead to market failures, such as higher prices and restricted access to knowledge.

Key topics in the economics of IP include the optimal strength and duration of IPRs. Stronger and longer protection may encourage innovation by offering greater potential rewards, but it can also slow down the diffusion of knowledge and hinder subsequent innovation.

Economists studying IP have also explored alternative models to standard intellectual property, including patent pools, innovation prizes, public funding of research, and mechanisms like the VCG mechanism. Such policies try to mitigate some downsides of traditional IP while still incentivizing creativity and investment.

== Theory ==
=== Incentive-access dilemma ===
The primary economic justification for IP rights is both their ability to address market failures in knowledge production. Knowledge goods are non-rivalrous and partially excludable, creating a free-rider problem where innovators struggle to capture the full social value of their inventions. Without legal protections, competitors can replicate innovations at marginal cost, eroding the profits needed to recoup upfront R&D investments. Patents and copyrights mitigate this by granting temporary monopolies, enabling price markups that fund future innovation. However, this creates a static efficiency loss: monopoly pricing restricts access, depriving society of optimal resource allocation in the short term. Economists study this trade-off by constructing mathematical models, which they use to calculate optimal patent durations that can balance deadweight losses of patents against innovation incentives.

=== Intellectual property as a public good ===
Information is a common example of a public good, because it is non-rivalrous (one person's use does not prevent others from using it) and because it is difficult to prevent free-riding (use of the good by someone who does not pay for it).

IP rights artificially introduce scarcity, transforming knowledge into a club good (an excludable but non-rivalrous good), where use requires licensing or purchase. This transformation enables markets to form around ideas but at the cost of allocative inefficiency. For example, pharmaceutical patents allow firms to price drugs above marginal costs, funding life-saving research, but limiting patient access.

=== Dynamic growth vs. static welfare trade-offs ===
A central tenet of IP economics is the intertemporal trade-off between current well-being and future innovation. Stronger IP protections shift welfare from consumers to producers, creating dynamic gains through increased R&D investment but static losses from reduced competition. Empirical studies suggest that the optimal level of IP strength varies by industry: in sectors with high imitation costs (e.g. aerospace), patents provide very little additional incentive, whereas in industries with low reverse-engineering barriers (e.g. software, medicine, and chemistry), robust IP rights significantly boost innovation.

== Alternative incentive mechanisms ==
Innovation prizes and advance market commitments (AMCs) have gained traction as potential supplements to or replacements for traditional intellectual property. The $1.5 billion COVAX AMC for COVID-19 vaccines demonstrated that guaranteed purchases can stimulate R&D without exclusive rights in some situations. Similarly, the Hydrogen Shot Prize aims to catalyze clean energy breakthroughs through milestone payments rather than patent monopolies. These models particularly suit fields with high spillovers, where IP's exclusionary nature impedes cumulative innovation.

== See also ==
- Intellectual property analytics
