= Price discovery =

Process of determining the price of an asset in the marketplace

In economics and finance, the price discovery process (also called price discovery mechanism) is the process of determining the price of an asset in the marketplace through the interactions of buyers and sellers.

== Overview ==
Price discovery is different from valuation. The price discovery process involves buyers and sellers arriving at a transaction price for a specific item at a given time. It involves the following:

- Buyers and sellers (number, size, location, and valuation perceptions)
- Market mechanism (bidding and settlement processes, liquidity)
- Available information (amount, timeliness, significance and reliability) including futures and other related markets
- Risk management choices.

"Market" is a broad term that covers buyers, sellers and even sentiment. A single market will have one or more execution venues, which describes where trades are executed. This could be in the street for a street market, or increasingly it could be an electronic or "virtual" venue. Examples of virtual execution venues include NASDAQ, The London Metal Exchange, NYSE, London Stock Exchanges.

After the 2001 Enron scandal, the Sarbanes–Oxley Act tightened accounting rules on the "mark to market" method. Now, only recently discovered prices may be used, to stop companies from overvaluing their assets. Each night (or reporting period), they have to take a recently discovered market price, obtained from two or more market observers.

== Factors of sensitivity ==
Recent changes in market regulations, since the collapse of Lehman Brothers, have outlined practices that affect the price discovery mechanism. Price discovery is sensitive to many factors. For a specific execution venue, the following inputs may drive the price discovery mechanism:

- Number of buyers
- Number of sellers
- Number of items for sale in that trading period
- Number of recent sales or purchase price (this is the price at which items traded)
- Current bid price
- Current offer price
- Availability of funding
- Obligations of participants (e.g. regulation, exchange rules, Fund Policy)
- Cost of execution (market fees and tax)
- Cost, Availability and Transparency of pricing information in current and other execution venues.

The cost of execution applies to all markets, and even a street market trader may have to pay to have a stall or invest time walking to a village market. They are not costs of production but a cost incurred to access the execution venue.

Price discovery is a summation of the total market's sentiment at a point in time: a multifaceted, aggregate view on the future. It is how every price in every market is determined. The market price is important as it is a factor in the pricing at off market execution venues and direct and indirect derived products. For example, the price of oil has a direct bearing on the cost of tomatoes in cold climates.

Market rules set the times and duration for trades and settlement. Some markets may not have many participants as the assets being traded do not have much appeal (the formal term is market interest in which participants express interest in the underlying asset). Such markets are often called illiquid, for example minor currencies. In illiquid markets, price discovery might take place at a predefined auction time or even whenever participant wants to trade. In such cases there may be no executions for days or months. In such examples there is no price discovery for long periods so the last traded price is used. This can have significant risk as the market for the illiquid may have moved. Another characteristic of illiquid markets is that the cost of trading can be higher due to the lack of competition.

In a dynamic market, the price discovery takes place continuously while items are bought and sold. The price will sometimes fall below the duration average and sometimes exceed the average as a result of the noise due to uncertainties, and transient changes in supply caused by the act of buying and selling: trading. A closed market has no price discovery; the last trade price is all that is known. It is common in some markets not to use the actual last traded price but some sort of average / weighted mean. This is to prevent price manipulation by the execution of outliers on or at market close. One side effect of this practice is that market close prices are not always available at market close, indeed even after the official market close is published, it is possible for "corrections" to be issued later still.

Usually, price discovery helps find the exact price for a commodity or a share of a company. Price discovery is used in speculative markets which affect traders, manufacturers, exporters, farmers, oil well owners, refineries, governments, consumers, and speculators.

== Mismarking ==
During market downturns, determining the value of illiquid securities held in portfolios becomes especially challenging, in part because of the amount of debt associated with these securities and in part because of fewer mechanisms for price discovery. As a result, during such periods illiquid securities are especially susceptible to fraudulent mismarking.

== Over-the-counter price recognition ==
Thanks to the networking of information on online platforms, the process of price recognition can increasingly take place outside of traditional stock exchange-like markets.

== See also ==
- Arbitrage pricing theory (APT)
- Auction
- Efficient market hypothesis
- Initial public offering
- Market-based valuation
- Pricing
- Real estate appraisal
- Stock valuation
- Single-index model
