= De-linkage =

De-linkage is a proposed model for development of new pharmaceutical drugs where "de-link" refers to isolating the profitability of a drug from its volume of sales.

In the current business model, the pharmaceutical industry relies on the pricing and sales of its products to generate profits and to finance research and development of new drugs. This ability is dependent on the monopoly granted through patents.

In the de-linkage model, other means (such as lump sums) would be used to reward companies for research and development in exchange for restricting the price charged for the product. This would allow the product to be sold at prices closer to production costs which would ensure better access, particularly for poor people and those who pay for their own treatment.

== History ==
De-linkage was first promoted by civil society organizations as a better way of financing research and development than the patent-based system, alongside possible ways to implement financing flexibilities internationally. This was opposed by the industry as it was seen as an attack on the patent system on which the current business model depended. It was also questioned because it involved governments deciding how R&D should be rewarded instead of the free market. An early effort to implement delinkage of R&D incentives from drug prices was the Medical Innovation Prize Fund legislation first introduced in the House of Representatives by Bernie Sanders in 2005, and subsequently revised and reintroduced several times. Several national governments support measures to move toward delinkage.

== De-linkage and development of new antibiotics ==
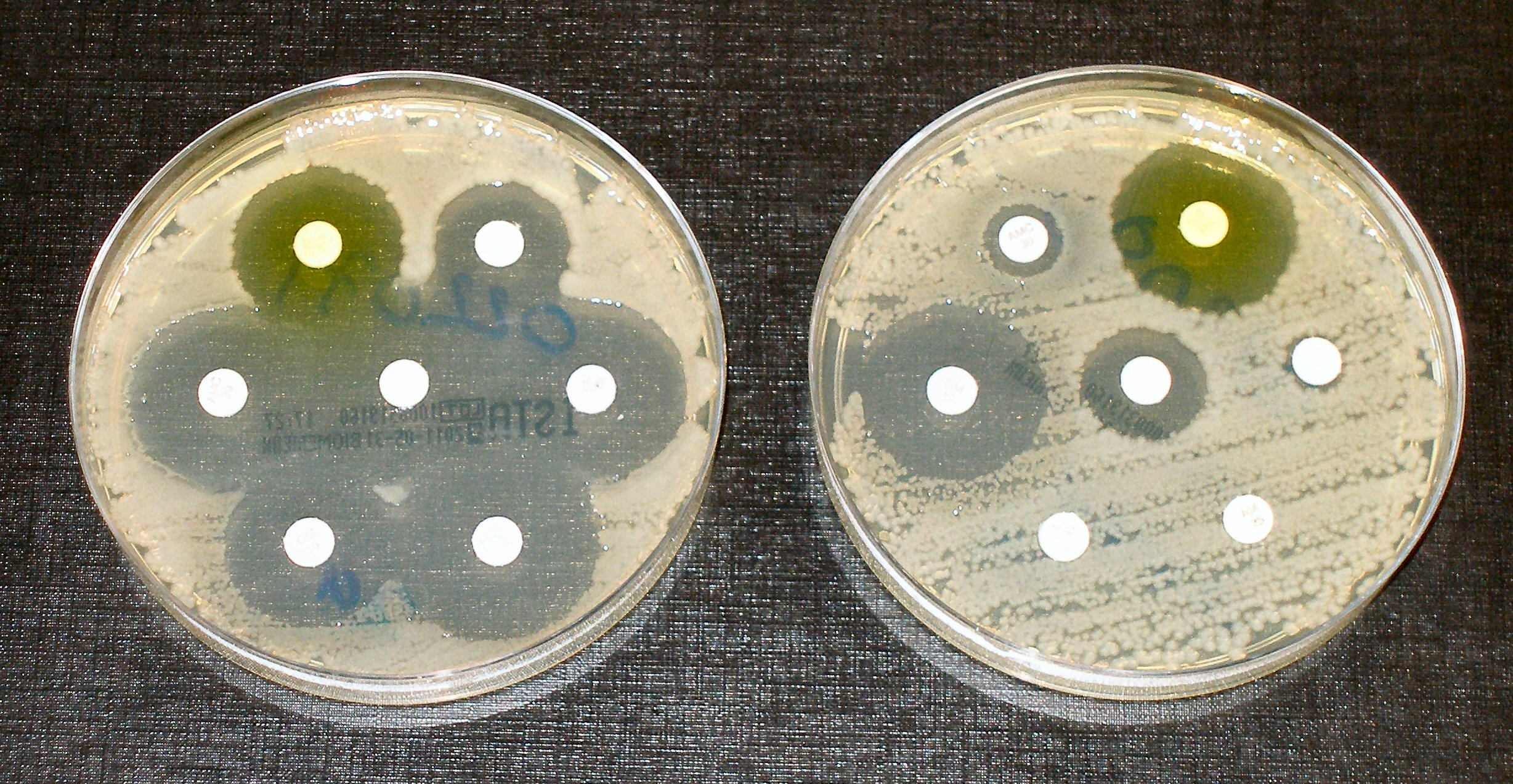
Antibiotic resistance tests

Until resistance has emerged against a previous generation of antibiotic, commercial return for any given new drug is uncertain. Therefore, the de-linkage model may be preferable in the context of developing new antibiotics and the fight against resistance where new antibiotics initially are unlikely to sell in large quantities because they should be reserved for use only when all other options have been exhausted. De-linkage also removes the incentive for the industry to boost sales that may encourage overuse that accelerate the development of antibiotic resistance.

== See also ==
- Decoupling (utility regulation)
- Attention economy, time on site and the link between profit and customer attention
