= Decoupling (utility regulation) =

In public utility regulation, decoupling refers to the disassociation of a utility's profits from its sales of an energy commodity. Instead, a rate of return is aligned with meeting revenue targets and rates are adjusted to meet the target at the end of the adjustment period.

Most current rate designs place the focus on commodity sales, tying a distribution company's recovery of fixed costs directly to its commodity sales.

While many environmentalists and conservation advocates support decoupling, many consumer advocates representing utility ratepayers have opposed decoupling as it attempts to guarantee revenue levels to utility companies. Decoupling mechanisms reduce a utility company's financial risk from reducing sales, due to conservation, weather and economic conditions. As a result, many consumer advocates have requested and state and federal regulators have required that utility companies profit levels (measured through a return on equity allowance) be reduced to reflect lower risk.

== Decoupling plus ==
Decoupling plus is an economics term for the decoupling of higher profits for energy producers from higher energy use. Through government regulation, the energy producer makes a higher profit when energy conservation targets are met.

== See also ==
- De-linkage, a proposed model for development of new pharmaceutical drugs where the profitability of a drug is isolated from its volume of sales
- Resource productivity
- Sustainability accounting
