= Purchase price allocation =

Application of goodwill accounting

Purchase price allocation (PPA) is an application of goodwill accounting whereby one company (the acquirer), when purchasing a second company (the target), allocates the purchase price into various assets and liabilities acquired from the transaction.

In the United States, the process of conducting a PPA is typically conducted in accordance with the Financial Accounting Standards Board's ("FASB") Statement of Financial Accounting Standards No. 141 (revised 2007) “Business Combinations” (“SFAS 141r”) and SFAS 142 “Goodwill and Other Intangible Assets” (“SFAS 142”). Effective for financial statements issued for interim and annual periods ending after September 15, 2009, the FASB "Accounting Standards Codification" ("ASC") reorganizes the FASB statements and represents a single authoritative source of U.S. accounting and reporting standards for nongovernmental entities. The set of guidelines prescribed by SFAS 141r are generally found in ASC Topic 805. Outside the United States, the International Accounting Standards Board governs the process through the issuance of IFRS 3.

Purchase price allocations are performed in conformity with the purchase method of merger and acquisition accounting. In the United States, a second method (known as the pooling or pooling-of-interests method) was discontinued after the issuance of the Statement of Financial Accounting Standards No. 141 “Business Combinations” (“SFAS 141”) and SFAS 142.

== Example ==
A company wishes to acquire a particular target company for a variety of reasons. After much negotiation, a purchase price of $30B is agreed upon by both sides. As of the acquisition date, the target company reported net identifiable assets of $8B on its own balance sheet.

In order to correctly report the combined company post-acquisition, one needs to evaluate the assets and liabilities being acquired and their Fair Value ("FV") -- the price that would be received to sell an asset or paid to transfer a liability in an orderly transaction between market participants at the measurement date. The acquirer hires an appraisal firm (typically an external accounting firm or a valuation advisor) who reports that the FV of the net assets is $24B. The fair value adjustment can relate to any assets or liabilities recorded on the balance sheet (or off-balance sheet items that should be recorded). One usual suspect can be fixed assets where it is likely that for example the book value of property can deviate significantly from its fair market value. Also intangible assets are identified and recognised at their fair market value. This can include, but is not limited to, customer relationships, technology, order backlog, brand, favourable- or unfavourable contracts, investments in associates. IFRS 3 also provide guidance for leases acquired in a business combination, where the lease liability should be remeasured at the acquisition date. The target's workforce is also of value, as the acquiree does not need to hire and train the assembled workforce in place. Consequently, the workforce is valued separately, however, recorded as part of goodwill as it does not meet the detectable and control criteria.

The figure below walks through the difference between the three values ($8B, $24B, and $30B).

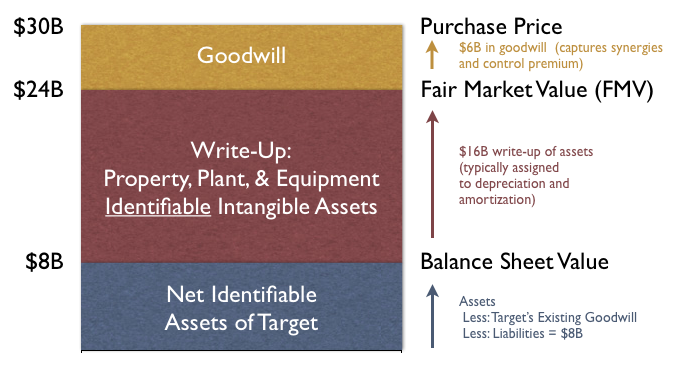

The difference between the $8 and $24 is $16B in write-up -- the values of the net identifiable assets are in effect increased to 3 times the value reported on the original balance sheet. The difference between the $24B and $30B is $6B in goodwill acquired through the transaction—the excess of the purchase price paid over the FV of the net identifiable assets acquired.

Finally, the acquirer adds both the value of the written-up assets ($24B) as well as the goodwill ($6B) onto the balance sheet, for a total of $30B in new net assets on the acquirer's balance sheet.

Collectively, the process of conducting the appraisal, reporting the FV of the assets and liabilities, the allocation of the net identifiable assets from the old balance sheet price to the FV, and the determination of the goodwill in the transaction, is referred to as the PPA process. Note that a purchase price may be less than the target's balance sheet value for a variety of reasons, which can lend itself to a write-down of net assets.

The process of valuing goodwill, while a component of the PPA process, is governed through goodwill accounting.
