= NOPLAT =

Net operating profit less adjusted taxes (NOPLAT) refers to after-tax EBIT adjusted for deferred taxes, or NOPAT + net increase in deferred taxes. It represents the profits generated from a company's core operations after subtracting the income taxes related to the core operations and adding back in taxes that the company had overpaid during the accounting period. It excludes income from non-operating assets or financing, such as interest, and includes only profits generated by invested capital. NOPLAT is the profit available to all equity stakeholders including providers of debt, equity, other financing and to shareholders. NOPLAT is distinguished from net income, which is the profit available to equity holders only. NOPLAT is often used as an input in creating discounted cash flow valuation models. It is used in preference to Net Income as it removes the effects of capital structure (debt vs. equity).

NOPLAT minus the monetary cost of all capital (both equity and debt) equals economic profit, which is quite similar to the trademarked EVA model.

Though an analyst should make thorough adjustments to account for amortization, intertemporal tax differences, taxes on nonoperating income, and other adjustments, sometimes the following simple back-of-the-envelope formula is employed to show de-levered profits by removing the effects of a debt tax shield:

Operating earnings = After-tax operating profit + (Interest paid * (1 — tax rate))
