= Intellectual property valuation =

Intellectual property valuation is a process to determine the monetary value of intellectual property assets. IP valuation is required to be able to sell, license, or enter into commercial arrangements based on IP. It is also beneficial in the enforcement of IP rights, for internal management of IP assets, and for various financial processes.

== Context ==
Intellectual property assets are part of the non-physical property of a business. They are a sub-set of intangible assets and distinguished from other intangible assets by the fact that they are created by law. As such, IP assets are legally protected and can be legally enforced. These can be independently identified, are transferable and have an economic life (in contrast to their legal life, which is generally longer than their economic life). They include patents, industrial designs, trademarks, copyright, and trade secrets.

Intellectual property derives its value from a wide range of parameters such as usefulness, market share, barriers to entry, legal protection, profitability, industrial and economic factors, growth projections, remaining economic life, and new technologies, all of which will inhere in the valuation. The value of an IP asset essentially comes from the right the owner of that asset has to exclude competitors from using it. For an IP asset to have a quantifiable value it should:

- generate a measurable amount of economic benefits to its owner or authorized user; and
- enhance the value of other assets with which it is associated. Value can be derived through direct exploitation of the IP by integrating it within the product, or sale or licensing of the IP to a third party or other means, such as raising barriers to entry or reducing the threat of substitutes.

An IP valuation - or economic appraisal - is prepared, for example, for transactions, merger and acquisition, pricing and strategic purposes, financing securitization and collateralization, tax planning and compliance, and litigation support.

Finally, the information is devoted to be turned into financial models to estimate the fundamental value of a particular type of intellectual property based on such adapted International Valuation Standards.

- Uniform Standards of Professional Appraisal Practice (USPAP)
- International Valuation Standards Committee (IVSC) (50 Countries)
- US Generally Accepted Accounting Principles (GAAP)
- International Financial Reporting Standards (IFRS)
- Financial Accounting Standards Board (FASB)

== Approaches ==
In order to be able sell, license or enter into any commercial arrangements based on IP, the owner need to be able to put a value on an IP asset. IP valuation is also beneficial in the enforcement of IP rights, for internal management of IP assets, and for various financial processes.

The valuation process necessitates gathering much more information as well as in-depth understanding of economy, industry, and specific business that directly affect the value of the intellectual property. Therefore, such information may be gathered from external and / or internal sources

To be able to value an IP asset, the asset should meet the following conditions:

- It must be separately identifiable (subject to specific identification and with a recognizable description)
- There should be tangible evidence of the existence of the asset (e.g. a contract, a license, a registration document, record in financial statements, etc.)
- It should have been created at an identifiable point in time.
- It should be capable of being legally enforced and transferred.
- Its income stream should be separately identifiable and isolated from those of other business assets.
- It should be able to be sold independently of other business assets.
- It should be subject to destruction or termination at an identifiable point in time.

The valuation analysts use numerous approaches in order to reach a reasonable indication of a defined value for the subject intangible assets on a certain date which is referred to as the valuation date. The most common approaches to estimate the fundamental or fair value of the intellectual property are defined as the following:

1. Income approach: This approach estimates the fair value of intellectual property by discounting the future economic benefits of ownership at an appropriate discount rate. It is the most commonly used method for IP valuation. This method is easiest to use for IP assets with positive cash flows, for those whose cash flows can be estimated with some degree of reliability for future periods, and where a proxy for risk can be used to obtain discount rates.
2. Cost approach: The cost approach is based on the economic principle of substitution. This principle states that an investor will pay no more for an asset than the cost to obtain, by purchasing or constructing, a substitute asset of equal utility. There are several cost approach valuation methods, the most common being the historical cost, replacement cost, and replication cost. The cost method is particularly useful when the IP asset can be easily reproduced and when the economic benefits of the asset cannot be accurately quantified. This method does not account for wasted costs, nor does it consider any unique or novel characteristics of the asset.
3. Market approach: The market approach is based on the economic principle of competition and equilibrium. These principles conclude that, in a free and unrestricted market, supply and demand factors will drive the price of an asset at equilibrium point. Furthermore, it provides an indication of the value by comparing the price at which similar property has exchanged between willing buyers and sellers. Data on such similar transactions may be accessed in several public sources, including specialized royalty rate databases. This method has the advantage of being simple and based on market information, so it is often used to establish approximate values for use in determining royalty rates, tax, and inputs for the income method.
4. Direct approach: The direct approach is based on the current value of shares of intellectual property in an Intellectual Property (IP) Share Market.
5. Using the pay-off method on top of the four above mentioned methods is a way to enhance the valuation and analysis of intellectual property

Regardless of the method used, the valuation process requires gathering much information about the IP asset, as well as an in-depth understanding of the economy, industry, and specific business that directly affect its value. This information can be obtained by conducting an event-driven IP audit, as well as intellectual property background research.

== See also ==
- Economics and patents
- Patent portfolio
- Patent valuation
- Tax amortization benefit
- Intangible asset finance

== Sources ==
This article incorporates text from a free content work. Licensed under CC-BY-4.0. Text taken from Valuing Intellectual Property Assets, WIPO.
