= Earnings before interest, taxes, depreciation and amortization =

Accounting measure of a company's profitability

Earnings before interest, taxes, depreciation, and amortization, commonly known as EBITDA (/ˈiːbɪtdɑː, ˈɛb-/ EE-bit-dah, EB-it-dah), is a measure of a company's profitability of the operating business only, before any effects of indebtedness, state-mandated payments, and costs required to maintain its asset base. It is derived by subtracting from revenues all costs of the operating business (e.g., wages, costs of raw materials, and services) but not decline in asset value, cost of borrowing and obligations to governments. Although certain leases have been capitalized on the balance sheet (and depreciated in the profit and loss statement) since IFRS 16, its expenses are often still adjusted back into EBITDA given they are deemed operational in nature.

Though often shown on an income statement, it is not considered part of the Generally Accepted Accounting Principles (GAAP) by the SEC, hence in the United States the SEC requires that companies registering securities with it (and when filing its periodic reports) reconcile EBITDA to net income.

== History ==
The original concept of EBITDA was pioneered in the 1970s by billionaire investor John Malone. Early in his career, Malone developed EBITDA as a tool to evaluate the cash-generating ability of telecom companies. He advocated for its use over traditional metrics like earnings per share (EPS), arguing that EBITDA offered a more accurate reflection of financial performance for high-growth, capital-intensive businesses. Originally, Malone used EBITDA to attract lenders and investors, positioning it as a key element of his growth strategy. By focusing on EBITDA, he showcased a company's capacity to generate cash flow while effectively utilizing leveraged debt and reinvesting profits to minimize taxes—an approach that defined his investment philosophy.

EBITDA regained popularity during the dot-com boom, gaining popularity as a benchmark for assessing the financial health of rapidly expanding, technology companies.

== Usage and criticism ==
EBITDA is widely used when assessing the performance of a company. EBITDA is useful to assess the underlying profitability of the operating businesses alone, i.e. how much profit the business generates by providing the services, selling the goods etc. in the given time period. This type of analysis is useful to get a view of the profitability of the operating business alone, as the cost items ignored in the EBITDA computation are largely independent from the operating business: The interest payments depend on the financing structure of the company, the tax payments in the relevant jurisdictions as well as the interest payments, the depreciation on the asset base (and depreciation policy chosen), and the amortization on takeover history with its effect on goodwill among others. EBITDA is widely used to measure the valuation of private and public companies (e.g. saying that a certain company trades at x times EBITDA, meaning that the company value as expressed through its stock price equates to x times its EBITDA).

In its attempt to display EBITDA as a measure of the underlying profitability of the operating business, EBITDA is often adjusted for extraordinary expenses, i.e. expenses that the company believes do not occur on a regular basis. These adjustments can include bad debt expenses, any legal settlements paid, costs for acquisitions, charitable contributions and salaries of the owner or family members. The resulting metric is called adjusted EBITDA or EBITDA before exceptionals.

A negative EBITDA indicates that a business has fundamental problems with profitability. A positive EBITDA, on the other hand, does not necessarily mean that the business generates cash. This is because the cash generation of a business depends on capital expenditures (needed to replace assets that have broken down), taxes, interest and movements in working capital as well as on EBITDA.

While being a useful metric, one should not rely on EBITDA alone when assessing the performance of a company. The biggest criticism of using EBITDA as a measure to assess company performance is that it ignores the need for capital expenditures in its assessment. However, capital expenditures are needed to maintain the asset base which in turn allows for generating EBITDA. Warren Buffett famously asked, "Does management think the tooth fairy pays for capital expenditures?". A fix often employed is to assess a business on the metric EBITDA - Capital Expenditures.

== Margin ==
EBITDA margin refers to EBITDA divided by total revenue (or "total output", "output" differing from "revenue" according to changes in inventory).

== Variations ==
Example income statement
Revenue	$20,000
Cost of goods sold	-$8,000
Gross Profit	$12,000
Selling, general and administrative expenses	-$7,000
Earnings before interest, taxes, depreciation and amortization (EBITDA)	$5,000
Depreciation and amortization	-$1,500
Earnings before interest and taxes (EBIT) or Operating income	$3,500
Interest expenses	-$300
Earnings before taxes (EBT)	$3,200
Taxes	-$1,000
Earnings after tax (EAT) or Net income	$2,200

=== EBITA ===
Earnings before interest, taxes, and amortization (EBITA) is derived from EBITDA by subtracting depreciation.

EBITA is used to include effects of the asset base in the assessment of the profitability of a business. In that, it is a better metric than EBITDA, but has not found widespread adoption.

=== EBITDAR ===
Earnings before interest, taxes, depreciation, amortization, and rent costs (EBITDAR)
EBITDAR is derived from EBITDA by adding rent costs to EBITDA. It can be of use when comparing two companies in the same industry with different structure of their assets. For example, consider two nursing home companies: one company rents its nursing homes and the other owns its homes. The first business has rent expenses which are included in EBITDA whereas the second company has capital expenditures instead which are not included in EBITDA. Comparing these business on EBITDA level thus is not the right metric and EBITDAR addresses this problem. Other industries where EBITDAR is employed are e.g. hotel businesses or trucking businesses. Related to EBITDAR is "EBITDAL", "rent costs" being replaced by "lease costs".
Earnings before interest, taxes, depreciation, amortization, and restructuring costs (EBITDAR)
Some companies use an EBITDAR where "R" indicates "restructuring costs". While this analysis of profits before restructuring costs is also helpful, such a metric should better be termed "adjusted EBITDA".

=== EBIDA ===
Earnings Before Interest, Depreciation and Amortization (EBIDA) is a less well-known metric as opposed to EBITDA. It excludes factoring in the effects of taxes, but is considered a more conservative metric in that it makes fewer assumptions. EBIDA is not a Generally-Accepted Accounting Principles metric, and the way it is calculated is not universally standardized.

=== EBIDAX ===
Earnings Before Interest, Depreciation, Amortization and Exploration (EBIDAX) is a non-GAAP metric that can be used to evaluate the financial strength or performance of oil, gas or mineral company.

Costs for exploration are varied by methods and costs. Removal of the exploration portion of the balance sheet allows for a better comparison between the energy companies.

=== OIBDA ===
Operating income before depreciation and amortization (OIBDA) refers to an income calculation made by adding depreciation and amortization to operating income.

OIBDA differs from EBITDA because its starting point is operating income, not earnings. It does not, therefore, include non-operating income, which tends not to recur year after year. It includes only income gained from regular operations, ignoring items like FX changes or tax treatments.

Historically, OIBDA was created to exclude the impact of write-downs resulting from one-time charges, and to improve the optics for analysts comparing to previous period EBITDA. An example is the case of Time Warner, who shifted to divisional OIBDA reporting subsequent to write downs and charges resulting from the company's merger into AOL.

== See also ==
- Earnings before interest and taxes (EBIT)
- EV/EBITDA
- Gross profit
- Net income
- Net profit
- Operating margin
- Owner earnings
- Price–earnings ratio
- Revenue
