= EV/EBITDA =

Equity valuation metric

Enterprise value/EBITDA (more commonly referred to by the acronym EV/EBITDA) is a popular valuation multiple used to determine the fair market value of a company. By contrast to the more widely available P/E ratio (price-earnings ratio) it includes debt as part of the value of the company in the numerator and excludes costs such as the need to replace depreciating plant, interest on debt, and taxes owed from the earnings or denominator. It is the most widely used valuation multiple based on enterprise value and is often used as an alternative to the P/E ratio when valuing companies believed to be in a high-growth phase, and thus credits enterprises with higher startup costs, high debt relative to equity, and lower realised earnings.

== Use ==
A key advantage of EV/EBITDA is that it is independent of the capital structure (i.e. the mixture of debt and equity). Therefore this multiple can be used to compare companies with different levels of debt. It also avoids the significant shortcoming of the P/E ratio which can be materially affected by the level of leverage in the company.

For benchmarking purposes, an industry-average EV/EBITDA multiple is often calculated. This is based on a sample of listed companies to be used for comparison to the company of interest. An example of such an index is one that provides an average EV/EBITDA multiple on a wide sample of transactions on private companies in the Eurozone.

The reciprocal multiple EBITDA/EV is used as a measure of cash return on investment.

== See also ==
- Earnings before interest and taxes (EBIT)
- Earnings before interest, taxes, depreciation and amortization (EBITDA)
- Gross income
- Operating income before depreciation and amortization (OIBDA)
- PEG ratio (price/earnings to growth ratio)
- Revenue
