= Market-based valuation =

Form of stock valuation

A market-based valuation is a form of stock valuation that refers to market indicators, also called extrinsic criteria (i.e. not related to economic fundamentals and account data, which are intrinsic criteria).

== Examples of market valuation methods ==
=== Technical analysis ===
Technical analysis is the most characteristic market-based method, although it focuses more on timing than pricing.

Also, rough market comparison tools such as the PE ratio and the PEG ratio are used. More sophisticated forms of analysis (fundamental analysis, quantitative analysis, and behavioral analysis) use also some market criteria, such as the risk premium or beta coefficient.

Those criteria might be "tilted" in some valuation models in anticipation of their possible variation in the next future, or to adapt them to their historical statistical range or mean.

== See also ==
- List of valuation topics
- Price discovery
- Valuation using multiples
- Valuation using discounted cash flows
- Valuation using the Market Penetration Model
