= Incremental profit =

Incremental profit is the profit gain or loss associated with a given managerial decision. Total profit increases so long as incremental profit is positive. When incremental profit is negative, total profit declines. Similarly, incremental profit is positive (and total profit increases) if the incremental revenue associated with a decision exceeds the incremental cost. The incremental concept is so intuitively obvious that it is easy to overlook both its significance in managerial decision making and the potential for difficulty in correctly applying it.
For this reason, the incremental concept is sometimes violated in practice. For example, a firm may refuse to sublet excess warehouse space for $5000 per month because it figures its cost as $7500 per month -a price paid for a long-term lease on the facility. However, if the warehouse space represents excess capacity with no current value to the company, its historical cost of $7500 per month is irrelevant and should be disregarded. The firm would forego $5000 in profits by turning down the offer to sublet the excess warehouse space. Similarly, any firm that adds a standard allocated charge for fixed costs and overhead to the true incremental cost of production runs the risk of turning down profitable business.
