= Innovation prize model =

Patent Reform

Some economists have proposed replacing patents in some markets with an innovation prize model, which would use inducement prizes rather than temporary monopolies to reward research and development effort. In the United States, Senator Bernie Sanders has introduced legislation to create such a system for pharmaceuticals.

== Background ==
Patents provide a temporary monopoly on a product to the first inventor or firm to develop it. Patents vary in length but are designed to last long enough for the innovator to recoup their investment. The nature of patents makes them an incentive, so long as the product being invented is distributed to consumers through markets. While patented products are on the market, the producer can set any price, regardless of production costs, which typically dictate prices in markets. If a product is not distributed through markets, then a patent cannot provide an adequate incentive for innovation. Patents, however, provide benefits by restricting access to information. Stiglitz identifies this as a problem of patents for the innovation of drugs and other products being distributed not to make a profit, but to solve global problems.

Offering a prize, rather than a patent, according to Stiglitz, would address the lack of incentive for addressing problems such as disease in developing countries, and would make products immediately affordable rather than waiting for a patent to expire. Awarding prizes offers a fixed amount appropriate for reimbursing drug research. Today, many drug companies spend much of the money earned from patents on marketing and advertising rather than on research for the actual drugs.

Stiglitz goes on to assert that until generic versions of drugs reach the shelves, which occurs after a patent expires, the costs are borne by consumers due to prices not being dictated by the markets. These burdens are overwhelming in developing countries, and Stiglitz suggests they be lowered by offering prizes instead of patents. Stiglitz discusses the idea of using foreign aid assistance funds to finance prizes, as it would provide greater foreign aid than what funds are being used for currently.

== United States ==
Senator Bernie Sanders of Vermont introduced legislation in the United States Senate in 2005 and 2007, as H.R. 417 and S. 2210. Sanders has been a longtime proponent of Stiglitz's ideas and favors a system of incentives for innovation in medicine and pharmaceuticals over a system of patents, which he asserts grants company monopolies on drugs and drives up pharmaceutical prices.

=== The Medical Innovation Prize Fund Act S1137 and S1138 ===
The two bills proposed on May 26, 2011, by Senator Bernie Sanders would completely remove legal barriers to the manufacture and sale of generic drugs. The bills will give the government the right to set specific goals and direct research to certain areas of medicine. S1137 would apply to all prescription drugs, and S1138 is focused on HIV/AIDS medications. The bills call for both the government and private insurance companies to fund the "Medical Innovation Prize Fund." According to the S1137 bill, the innovation fund would be 0.55% of GDP, or $80 billion, based on 2010 numbers. S1138 calls for a 0.02% GDP fund for HIV/AIDS innovation prizes, amounting to about $3 billion a year.

In a statement made at a subcommittee meeting, Senator Sanders said, "It simply blew me away and would blow anyone's mind—that one drug, Atripla, costs $25,000 per year." He called this bill "fairly radical for the U.S. Congress". According to estimates, proponents of the bill believe that the costs of the prizes would be offset by the introduction of generic drugs and the reduction of monopoly power in the pharmaceutical industry. Sanders believes that these bills will save private insurers, Medicaid, and other government assistance programs money.

One of the goals of the bill is to "de-link research and development incentives from product prices," along with eliminating patents and, what the bill's author asserts, monopoly power. It aims to free research and development by proposing a possible "Open Source Dividend" element. This means that a percentage of the prize money from the innovation funds would go to those persons or communities that make knowledge, data, etc., available in the public domain and offer free access to patents.

Senator Sanders asserts that the prize funds will incentivize manufacturers to develop innovative treatments for illnesses and diseases that are more important to society. In addition, they state that these funds will lower drug prices and reduce what they claim are wasteful research and development costs. This bill has been favored by Joseph Stiglitz.

The Bill & Melinda Gates Foundation has tried this prize-fund model. Under its model, all applicants for funding from the Gates Foundation must waive all patent claims. "A World Health Organization (WHO) report, called 'Research and Development to Meet health Needs in Developing Countries,' backs prize funds, saying it is a financially viable model"

In 2012, the two bills were referred to the committee level in the Senate. They have not been put to a vote in either the Senate or the House. In 2009–2010, only 3% of all bills proposed in the Senate were enacted.

=== Other areas for prize models over patents ===
US President Barack Obama has pushed for innovation prizes, sponsoring 150 contests across 40 agencies in 2010. NASA paid out $6 million in prizes to companies since 2005 for innovation. Between 2000 and 2007, certain groups put $250 million into technologies that range from robotic arms to tuberculosis tests, according to Brian Vastag of The Washington Post.

=== Criticism ===
According to the Global Intellectual Property Center, studies show that prizes are better at proving a concept than bringing concrete, useful technologies into existence. Another criticism made by the Global Intellectual Property Center is that prizes will never be enough to reward lucky breaks that have brought about the most important innovations. Also, the center argues that prizes do not create incentives to drive a continuous cycle of advances and improvements because prizes are finite and limited.

The Global Intellectual Property Center also believes that prizes focus narrowly on certain acts or the "next new thing" and can distract from more significant innovations. They also assert that prizes do not hold researchers and inventors accountable for the findings of works or creations. The center argues that prizes, in turn, give rights to a product to a government, which then gives rights to the entire public. In the future, if there are any problems or questions with the creation or drug, it will be impossible to determine who is responsible for the flaw.

== See also ==
- Economics and patents
- Inducement prize contest
- Societal views on patents
- De-linkage
