= American Society of Appraisers =

American nonprofit organization

- Predecessor: The American Society of Technical Appraisers, Technical Valuation Society
- Founded: 1952; 74 years ago
- Headquarters: 2121 Cooperative Way, Suite 210 Herndon, VA 20171, United States
- Website: www.appraisers.org

The American Society of Appraisers (ASA) is an American nonprofit organization which serves as a professional affiliation of appraisers. It is a multi-discipline, voluntary membership, trade association, representing and promoting their member appraisers.

== History ==
The organization was formally formed in 1952, after consolidation of two prior appraisal organizations, the American Society of Technical Appraisers (ASTA), and the Technical Valuation Society (TVS).

In 2017, the society merged with National Association of Independent Fee Appraisers (NAIFA), bringing total membership to over 5,500 members in 75 countries.

The ASA is one of the eight trade association appraisal groups that founded The Appraisal Foundation.

== See also ==
- CBV Institute
- BC Assessment Authority
- International Valuation Standards Council (IVSC)
- American Institute of Certified Public Accountants (AICPA)
