= Valuation using the market penetration model =

Valuation using the market penetration model (MPM) or the growth potential of a company is a method of estimating the value of a company by calculating the depth of its market penetration as evidenced by its customer base and industry niche.

The process consists of:

- profiling a company's type of customer and analysing which complementary companies share these customers.
- valuing the barriers to entry into the industry niche that the company operates in.

== Valuation overview ==
The market penetration model focuses on the synergy and opportunities for fast growth between the target company and the acquiring company. It prioritises ability to exploit future customer opportunities over previous financial performance.

Many of the web 2.0 start up successes are valued using this method, due to the perceived value of customer attention over past profit.

== Advantages/ and disadvantages ==
=== Advantages ===
The MPM has some advantages over other valuation methods:

- Values intangible factors: such as customer attention, which are not otherwise reflected in financial data.
- Modern: The MPM is relevant to web based businesses whose value is not accurately portrayed in financial figures and hard assets.

=== Disadvantages ===
The main criticisms can be summarised as:

- Intangible: the assessment of the value of particular customer segmentation and industry niches is highly subjective.
- Reliance on competition between buyers: a buyer will not need to pay a premium for future growth potential if there is no competitive bidding process.

== Examples ==
Facebook's purchase of Instagram was based on the MPM. Instagram was a relatively small company, employing 13 programmers and was just two years old at the time of the sale. It had no revenue, but was initially valued at $1 billion on account of it highly desirable customer base (social media fanatics, smart phone users) and its attractive industry niche (smart phone space).

Several other high-profile tech companies have had a valuation based on the MPM including: Google's purchase of Snapseed and Money Supermarket's purchase of MoneySavingExpert.com ($120million).
