= International Valuation Standards Council =

Provfessional valuation organization

- Formation: 1981
- Headquarters: London, UK
- Website: http://www.ivsc.org/

The International Valuation Standards Council (IVSC) is an independent, not-for-profit, private sector standards organisation incorporated in the United States and with its operational headquarters in London, UK. IVSC develops international technical and ethical standards for valuations on which investors and others rely.

IVSC is responsible for developing the International Valuation Standards and associated technical guidance. To ensure that the public interest is effectively protected, it also engages with other bodies active in the regulation of the financial markets to ensure that valuation issues are properly understood and reflected. IVSC works cooperatively with national professional valuation institutes, users and preparers of valuations, governments, regulators and academic bodies, all of whom can become members of IVSC and play a role in advising the Boards on their agenda priorities.

In developing its standards and technical guidance, IVSC follows a process of issuing discussion papers and exposure drafts for public comment.

The IVSC is recognised by the United Nations Department of Economic and Social Affairs.

== Objectives and activities ==
The objectives of the IVSC are to strengthen the worldwide valuation profession by:

- Developing high-quality international standards and supporting their adoption and use
- Facilitating collaboration and cooperation among its member organisations
- Collaborating and cooperating with other international organisations and regulatory authorities
- Serving as the international voice for the valuation profession

== Boards ==
=== Board of trustees ===
The IVSC is governed by a board of trustees responsible for the strategic direction and funding of the organisation. The trustees are also responsible for the appointment of the Standards Boards and Membership and Standards Recognition Board.

The current board of trustees comprises:

- Lim Hwee Hua (Chair)
- Marcelo Barbosa
- Professor Mary E. Barth
- Jacque Potdevin
- Zhang Genghua
- Narayan Seshadri
- Ranjit Ajit Singh
- Iseo Pasquali
- Linda de Beer
- Japheth Katto
- Aiko Sekine

Notable former members:

- Michel Prada (Chair 2009 - 2011)
- Roel Campos (Interim Chair 2012)
- Sir David Tweedie (Chair 2012 - 2019)
- Alistair Darling (Chair 2019 - 2023)

== History ==
The origins of IVSC lie in the International Assets Valuation Standards Committee (TIAVSC) that was formed in 1981 with the objective of developing consistent standards across national borders. The founder members were a number of professional institutes mainly concerned with real property valuation. The Committee changed its name in 1994 to the International Valuation Standards Committee, and from the late 1990s started to include member organisations concerned with the valuation of assets other than real property.

Following a restructuring of the organization in 2008, its name was again changed, this time to the International Valuation Standards Council. As of 2022, the IVSC has over 180 organisations in membership from around the world. The organisations in membership accredit and regulate the conduct of individual valuers who specialize in the valuation of many different types of assets and liabilities, such as business interests, real property, intangibles, capital equipment and financial instruments.

The IVSC and the International Organization of Securities Commissions (IOSCO) announced a Cooperation Agreement in 2022 with a focus on enhancing international valuation standards and professionalism.

== The International Valuation Standards ==
The International Valuation Standards (IVS) are international standards that consist of various actions required during the undertaking of a valuation assignment supported by technical information and guidance. The IVSC's technical boards are responsible for the development and maintenance of the International Valuation Standards. The boards are independent and solicit public comment by issuing discussion papers and exposure drafts.

The latest version of the Standards (IVS 2022) was published in January 2024 and come into effect January 2025.

=== Objective of IVS ===
The objective of the International Valuation Standards (IVS) is to increase the confidence and trust of users of valuation services by establishing transparent and consistent valuation practices. A standard within IVS will do one or more of the following:

- identify or develop globally accepted principles and definitions,
- identify and promulgate considerations for the undertaking of valuation assignments and the reporting of valuations,
- identify specific matters that require consideration and methods commonly used for valuing different types of assets or liabilities.

The IVS consist of mandatory requirements that must be followed in order to state that a valuation was performed in compliance with the IVS. Certain aspects of the standards do not direct or mandate any particular course of action, but provide fundamental principles and concepts that must be considered in undertaking a valuation.

== IVS structure ==
=== IVS Glossary ===
The glossary defines certain terms used in the International Valuation Standards, but does not attempt to define basic valuation, accounting or finance terms, as valuers are assumed to have an understanding of such terms. Defined terms are Asset/Assets, Client, Jurisdiction, May, Must, Participant, Purpose, Should, Significant and/or Material, Subject or Subject Asset, Valuation Purpose or Purpose of Valuation, Valuation Reviewer, Valuer, Weight and Weighting.

=== IVS Framework ===
This serves as a preamble to the IVS. The IVS Framework consists of general principles for valuers following the IVS regarding objectivity, judgement, competence and acceptable departures from the IVS. The contents contain information on Compliance with Standards, Assets and Liabilities, Valuer, Objectivity, Competence and Departures.

=== General Standards ===
The five General Standards set forth requirements for the conduct of all valuation assignments, including establishing the terms of a valuation engagement, bases of value, valuation approaches and methods, and reporting. They are designed to be applicable to valuations of all types of assets and for any valuation purpose. The General Standards are IVS 101 Scope of Work, IVS 102 Investigations and Compliance, IVS 103 Reporting, IVS 104 Bases of Value and IVS 105 Valuation Approaches and Methods.

=== Asset Standards ===
The Asset Standards include requirements related to specific types of assets. These requirements must be followed in conjunction with the General Standards when performing a valuation of a specific asset type. The Asset Standards include certain background information on the characteristics of each asset type that influence value, and additional asset-specific requirements on common valuation approaches and methods used. The Asset Standards are IVS 200 Business and Business Interests, IVS 210 Intangible Assets, IVS 300 Plant and Equipment, IVS 400 Real Property Interests, IVS 410 Development Property and IVS 500 Financial Instruments.

== Revisions to IVS ==
The IVSC Standards Board intends to continuously review the IVS and update or clarify the standards as needed to meet stakeholder and market needs. The board has continuing projects that may result in additional standards being introduced or amendments being made to the standards in this publication at any time.

== Members ==
The IVSC has an internationally diverse array of member organisations, which they classify as Valuation Professional Organizations (VPO), Associate Valuation Professional Organizations (AVPO), Institutional Members (IM), Corporate Members (CM), and Academic Members (AM).

Members can be sorted by country, name and member type by clicking on the buttons in the header of the columns.

Country	Member	Type
Australia	Australian Property Institute	VPO
Australia	Australian Valuers' Institute	IM
Australia	CPA Australia	IM
Australia	Australian Institute of Business Brokers	AVPO
Australia	Chartered Accountants of Australia and New Zealand	IM
Austria	WU (Vienna University of Economics & Business) Financial Accounting and Auditing Group	AM
Austria	Austrian Chamber of Tax Advisors and Public Accountants	IM
Azerbaijan	Azerbaijan Society of Appraisers	AVPO
Bahrain	Real Estate Regulatory Authority, Bahrain	IM
Bangladesh	Institute of Chartered Valuers Bangladesh	AVPO
Bangladesh	Bangladesh Survey & Valuation Companies, Firms & Individual Concerns Associations	AVPO
Bangladesh	Financial Reporting Council Bangladesh	IM
Bangladesh	Institute of Chartered Accountants of Bangladesh	IM
Belgium	European Mortgage Federation - European Covered Bond Council	IM
Belgium	Institut des réviseurs d’entreprises (IRE) – Instituut van de bedrijfsrevisoren (IBR) (Institute of Registered Auditors)	IM
Bosnia and Herzegovina	Association of Certified Appraisers in Bosnia and Herzegovina	VPO
Bosnia and Herzegovina	Union of Accountants, Auditors & Financial Workers of Federation of Bosnia & Herzegovina	IM
Bosnia and Herzegovina	Bosnian & Herzegovinian Property Association	VPO
Botswana	Real Estate Institute of Botswana	VPO
Brazil	Instituto Brasileiro Avaliacoes	VPO
Brazil	Panamerican Union of Valuation Associations	AVPO
Brazil	Mynarski International Valuation	CM
Brazil	Conselho Federal de Corretores de Imóveis	IM
Bulgaria	Chamber of Professional Valuers	IM
Canada	Appraisal Institute of Canada	VPO
Canada	CBV Institute	VPO
Canada	International Association of Consultants, Valuators and Analysts	CM
Canada	International Institute of Business Valuators	AM
China	China Appraisal Society	VPO
China	Shanghai Orient Appraisal Company	CM
Colombia	Registro Nacional de Avaluadores	VPO
Costa Rica	Costa Rican Valuation Institute	VPO
Croatia	Croatian Society of Valuers	VPO
Czech Republic	University of Economics, Prague	AM
Egypt	Egyptian Association of Real Estate Appraisers	VPO
Egypt	Claro Real Estate Company	CM
Finland	Finnish Association for Real Estate Valuation	VPO
France	Fédération Française des Experts en Evaluation	IM
France	Real Quality Rating (RQR)	CM
France	Compagnie Nationale des Commissaires aux Comptes (CNCC)	IM
France	73 Strings SAS	CM
Georgia	Association of Professionals on Land and Realty	VPO
Georgia	Expertise Institute for Valuation of Assets of Georgia	VPO
Georgia	National Forensic Bureau of Georgia	IM
Georgia	Valuers & Experts Professional Development Centre	IM
Germany	Institut der Wirtschaftsprufer	IM
Germany	European Association of Certified Valuators and Analysts	VPO
Germany	HypZert GmbH	VPO
Germany	Institute for Mergers, Acquisitions and Alliances GmbH	AM
Hong Kong	Greater China Appraisal Ltd	CM
Hong Kong	Hong Kong Institute of Surveyors	VPO
Hong Kong	Chartered Valuation Analyst Institution	AVPO
Hong Kong	AVISTA Valuation Advisory Ltd	CM
India	The Practising Valuers Association of India	VPO
India	Institute of Chartered Accountants of India	IM
India	Institute of Cost Accountants of India	IM
India	Institution of Valuers of India	VPO
India	Techno India University, West Bengal	AM
India	Indian Inst of Corporate Affairs	AM
India	ICMAI Registered Valuers Organisation	AM
India	IIV India Registered Valuers Foundation	AVPO
India	Divya Jyoti Valuers Foundation	AVPO
India	All India Institute of Valuers Foundation	AVPO
India	Institute of Company Secretaries of India	IM
India	Institution of Valuers India Registered Valuers Foundation	VPO
India	CEV Integral Appraisers Foundation	VPO
Indonesia	Indonesian Society of Appraisers	VPO
Ireland	Technology University Dublin, School of Surveying and Construction Management	AM
Ireland	Society of Chartered Surveyors Ireland	VPO
Israel	Israel Real Estate Appraisers Association (IREAA)	VPO
Italy	Consiglio Nazionale Geometri	VPO
Italy	Consiglio Nazionale dei Dottori Commercialisti e degli Esperti Contabili	IM
Italy	SIDREA (Italian Association of Professors in Accounting & Business Administration)	AM
Japan	Japanese Institute of Certified Public Accountants	IM
Japan	Japanese Association of Real Estate Appraisal	VPO
Japan	Tokyo Financial Advisors Co Ltd	CM
Kazakhstan	Chamber of Professional Appraisers of Kazakhstan	VPO
Kazakhstan	Republican Chamber of Appraisers of Kazakhstan	VPO
Kenya	Institution of Surveyors of Kenya (ISK)	VPO
South Korea	Korean Institute of Certified Public Accountants	IM
Kosovo	KAF Institute	AVPO
Kuwait	Kuwait Real Estate Association	IM
Kuwait	International Real Estate Valuer, owned by Emad Alfaraj	CM
Latvia	Latvian Association of Appraisers	VPO
Lithuania	The Authority of Audit, Accounting, Property Valuation and Insolvency Management Lithuania	IM
Malawi	University of Malawi - The Polytechnic	AM
Malaysia	The Royal Institution of Surveyors, Malaysia	VPO
Malaysia	Malaysian Institute of Accountants	IM
Mexico	Federación de Colegios de Valuadores, A.C. (FECOVAL)	VPO
Moldova	Agency for Land Relations and Cadastre of the Republic of Moldova	IM
Mongolia	Mongolian Institute of Certified Appraisers	VPO
Montenegro	Chamber of Valuers of Montenegro	VPO
Montenegro	Institute of Certified Accountants of Montenegro	VPO
Namibia	Ministry of Land Reform	IM
Nepal	Nepal Valuers' Association	AVPO
Netherlands	NRVT	VPO
New Zealand	Property Institute of New Zealand (PINZ)	VPO
Nigeria	Nigerian Institution of Estate Surveyors and Valuers	VPO
Nigeria	Estate Surveyors and Valuers Registration Board of Nigeria	IM
North Macedonia	Bureau for Court Expertise, Republic of North Macedonia	VPO
North Macedonia	Chamber of Valuation of the Republic of North Macedonia	VPO
Norway	Norges Takseringsforbund	VPO
Oman	Al Muheet Institute	AM
Peru	Technical Appraisers Corps of Peru (Cuerpo Tecnico de Tasaciones del Peru)	AVPO
Philippines	Institute of Philippine Real Estate Appraisers (IPREA)	VPO
Philippines	Philippines Bureau of Local Government Finance	IM
Philippines	Philippines Association of Realty Appraisers	AVPO
Qatar	Al Asmakh Real Estate	CM
Poland	The Polish Federation of Valuer’s Associations	VPO
Romania	The National Association of Romanian Valuers	VPO
Russian Federation	Russian Society of Appraisers	VPO
Russian Federation	Self-Regulated Inter-Regional Appraisers Association (SIAA	VPO
Rwanda	Institute of Real Property Valuers in Rwanda	AVPO
Saudi Arabia	Public Investment Fund	CM
Saudi Arabia	Saudi Authority for Accredited Valuers (Taqeem)	IM
Serbia	National Association of Valuers of Serbia	VPO
Singapore	Singapore Institute of Surveyors and Valuers	VPO
Singapore	Institute of Valuers & Appraisers of Singapore	VPO
Singapore	United Overseas Bank Ltd	CM
Singapore	Sea Ltd	CM
Singapore	DBS Bank Ltd	CM
Singapore	OCBC Bank	CM
Slovenia	Slovenian Institute of Auditors	VPO
South Africa	South African Institute of Valuers	VPO
South Africa	South African Council for Property Valuers Profession (SACPVP)	IM
South Africa	South African Institute of Chartered Accountants (SAICA)	IM
South Africa	Office of the Valuer General (South Africa)	VPO
Spain	Asociación Profesional de Sociedades de Valoración (ATASA)	VPO
Spain	Asociación Espanola de Analisis de Valor (AEV)	IM
Sri Lanka	Institute of Valuers of Sri Lanka	VPO
Sudan	Pro Serve Engineering Consulting Co Ltd	CM
Sweden	ASPECT - Association for Chartered Surveying, Property Evaluation and Transactions	VPO
Switzerland	Swiss Institute of Real Estate Appraisal (SIREA)	AM
Switzerland	Institute of Finance, University of Applied Science and Arts Northwestern Switzerland	AM
Thailand	Thai Valuers Association	VPO
Turkey	Real Estate Development and Management, Ankara University	AM
Turkey	Turkish Appraisers Association	VPO
Turkey	ACCYBER	CM
Turkmenistan	Union of Economists of Turkmenistan	AVPO
Uganda	Institute of Surveyors of Uganda	IM
Ukraine	Ukrainian Society of Appraisers	VPO
Ukraine	Pan-Ukrainian Association of Valuation Specialists (PUAVS)	AVPO
United Arab Emirates	Abu Dhabi Municipality, Property Registration Section	IM
United Arab Emirates	Dubai Land Dept, Taqyeem (Real Estate Appraisal Centre)	IM
United Kingdom	Royal Institution of Chartered Surveyors	VPO
United Kingdom	Institute of Chartered Accountants in England and Wales (ICAEW)	IM
United Kingdom	Brand Finance	CM
United Kingdom	Savills (UK) Ltd	CM
United Kingdom	DFK International	CM
United States	Appraisal Foundation	IM
United States	International Association of Assessing Officers	IM
United States	Appraisal Institute (AI)	VPO
United States	American Society of Appraisers (ASA)	VPO
United States	American Institute of Certified Public Accountants (AICPA)	VPO
United States	Berkeley Research Group (BRG)	CM
United States	Business Valuation Resources	CM
United States	CFA Institute	VPO
United States	Chronograph	CM
United States	Harvest Investments Ltd	CM
United States	International Finance Corporation (IFC)	IM
United States	National Council for Real Estate Investment Fiduciaries (NCREIF)	IM
United States	Jones Lang LaSalle	CM
United States	Leventhal School of Accounting, University of S California	AM
United States	Lincoln International LLP	CM
United States	Valuation Research Corporation	CM
United States	414 Capital Inc	CM
Uzbekistan	Association of Appraisal Organisations of Uzbekistan	IM
Vietnam	Price Control Department, Ministry of Finance	IM

== Sponsors ==
The following organizations are listed as sponsors of the IVSC in 2022/23:

- American Institute of Certified Public Accountants
- American Society of Appraisers
- The Appraisal Foundation
- Appraisal Institute
- Appraisal Institute of Canada
- BDO Global
- Bloomberg L.P.
- CBV Institute
- CFA Institute
- China Appraisal Society
- DBS Bank
- Deloitte
- Ernst & Young
- Grant Thornton International
- Houlihan Lokey
- International Finance Corporation
- KPMG
- Kroll
- Lincoln International
- Mazars
- Multilateral Investment Guarantee Agency
- OCBC Bank
- Organismo Italiano di Valutazione (OIV)
- Public Investment Fund
- PricewaterhouseCoopers
- Royal Institution of Chartered Surveyors
- Saudi Authority for Accredited Valuers (Taqeem)
- Sea Group Ltd
- Stout
- United Overseas Bank
