= Net operating profit after taxes =

Financial measurement

In corporate finance, net operating profit after tax (NOPAT) is a company's after-tax operating profit for all investors, including shareholders and debt holders. NOPAT is used by analysts and investors as a precise and accurate measurement of profitability to compare a company's financial results across its history and against competitors.

When calculating NOPAT, one removes Interest Expense and the effects of other non-operating activities (non-recurring gains and losses) from Net Income to arrive at a value that approximates the value of a firm's annual earnings. NOPAT is precisely calculated as:

NOPAT = (Net Income - after-tax Non-operating Gains + after-tax Non-operating Losses + after-tax Interest Expense)

NOPAT doesn't include one-time losses and other non-recurring charges, because they don't represent the true, ongoing profitability of the business. For example, a company may incur acquisition costs that would not be expected to occur in the future. These costs would negatively affect current year earnings, but do not accurately portray the operations of the firm. These costs should be excluded when performing any type of analysis to determine the operating and financial efficiency of a firm or to compare performance against other firms.

According to analyst and economist, Joseph Noko, "An added difficulty is that the elements we need to determine the operating performance of a business are not simply on the face of the financial statement, but they are sprinkled across the annual report, in the MD&A, the footnotes and notes. Moreover, managers are given enormous discretion in classifying items and how they can present disclosures. Further complications are that judgement must be exercised to determine a disclosure’s impact on operating performance and to place each disclosure in the proper economic category." He argues that great diligence must be paid to ensure that NOPAT is calculated accurately, making adjustments for both reported and hidden items. Noko notes that NOPAT can be calculated in two mathematically equivalent ways. From a financing perspective, NOPAT can be described as below,

NOPAT (Financing Approach)
GAAP Net Income
+ Adj. for Capitalized Expenses
+ Increase in Equity Equivalents
– Other Income
+ Other Expenses
– Hidden Items
+ Interest Expense After Taxes
NOPAT

whereas, from an operating perspective, NOPAT can be described as below,

NOPAT (Operating Approach)
Operating Revenue
– Operating Expenses
– Hidden Items
= Earnings Before Interest and Taxes (EBIT)
+ Goodwill Amortization
= Earnings Before Interest, Taxes, and Amortization (EBITA)
+ Adjustments for Capitalized Expenses
+ Income Equivalents
Net Operating Profit Before Tax (NOPBT)
Cash Operating Taxes
NOPAT

== See also ==
- Economic value added
- Free cash flow
- Financial statement analysis

== External sources ==
- G. Benett Stewart III (1991). The Quest for Value. HarperCollins.
