= Fair market value =

Legal concept

The fair market value of property is the price at which it would change hands between a willing and informed buyer and seller. The term is used throughout the United States Internal Revenue Code, as well as in bankruptcy laws, in many state laws, and by several regulatory bodies.

In litigation in many jurisdictions in the United States the fair market value is determined at a hearing. In certain jurisdictions, the courts are required to hold fair market hearings, even if the borrowers or the loans guarantors waived their rights to such a hearing in the loan documents.

FMV is often used for taxation purposes, determining the value of charitable donations, estate planning, and other financial transactions. The specific methods used to determine FMV may vary depending on the type of property or asset involved.

Fair market value is subjective and can fluctuate based on market conditions, supply and demand, location, and other factors.

== Definition ==
=== United States ===
The fair market value is the price at which property would change hands between a willing buyer and a willing seller, neither being under any compulsion to buy or to sell and both having reasonable knowledge of relevant facts. United States v. Cartwright, 411 U. S. 546, 93 S. Ct. 1713, 1716-17, 36 L. Ed. 2d 528, 73-1 U.S. Tax Cas. (CCH) ¶ 12,926 (1973) (quoting from U.S. Treasury regulations relating to Federal estate taxes, at 26 C.F.R. sec. 20.2031-1(b)).

=== Canada ===
Fair market value is not explicitly defined in the Income Tax Act. That said, Mr. Justice Cattanach in Henderson Estate, Bank of New York v. M.N.R., (1973) C.T.C. 636 at p. 644 articulates the concept as follows:

The statute does not define the expression "fair market value", but the expression has been defined in many different ways depending generally on the subject matter which the person seeking to define it had in mind. I do not think it necessary to attempt an exact definition of the expression as used in the statute other than to say that the words must be construed in accordance with the common understanding of them. That common understanding I take to mean the highest price an asset might reasonably be expected to bring if sold by the owner in the normal method applicable to the asset in question in the ordinary course of business in a market not exposed to any undue stresses and composed of willing buyers and sellers dealing at arm's length and under no compulsion to buy or sell. I would add that the foregoing understanding as I have expressed it in a general way includes what I conceive to be the essential element which is an open and unrestricted market in which the price is hammered out between willing and informed buyers and sellers on the anvil of supply and demand. These definitions are equally applicable to "fair market value" and "market value" and it is doubtful if the word "fair" adds anything to the words "market value."

In concert with this decision, the Canada Revenue Agency (CRA) lists the following working definition in its on-line dictionary:

Fair market value generally means the highest price, expressed in dollars, that a property would bring in an open and unrestricted market between a willing buyer and a willing seller who are both knowledgeable, informed, and prudent, and who are acting independently of each other.

As the definition indicates, the Canadian and American concepts of fair market value are very similar. One obvious difference is that the Canadian working definition refers to "the highest price" whereas the American definition merely mentions "the price." It is debatable whether or not the presence of the word "highest" distinguishes the Canadian from the American definition.

== See also ==
- Liquidation value
- Market price
- Real estate appraisal
