= Port of Tianjin operations and logistics =

Port in People's Republic of China

Port of Tianjin 天津港
- Interactive map of Port of Tianjin 天津港

Location
- Country: China
- Location: Tianjin
- Coordinates: 38°59′N 117°47′E

Details
- Opened: 1860 (Port of Tanggu); 1952-10-17 (Tianjin Xingang reopening)
- Operated by: Tianjin Port Group Ltd
- Owned by: Tianjin State-owned Assets Supervision and Administration Commission
- Type of harbour: Deep-water Seaport/Riverport
- Land area: 121 km^{2}
- Size: 260 km^{2} (470 km^{2} total jurisdictional area)
- No. of berths: 217; Production Berths: 140 (2010)
- Employees: 20,000 (2008)
- Chairman: Yu Rumin
- UN/LOCODE: CNTXG or CNTSN (formerly CNTJP/CNTGU)
- World Port Index Number: 60190
- Nautical Charts: 94363/0 (NGA/NIMA); 2653/4 (Admiralty); 11773/4(Chinese)

Statistics
- Annual cargo tonnage: 453 million tonnes (2011)
- Annual container volume: 11.5 million TEU (2011)
- Value of cargo: 197.249 billion USD (2011)
- Passenger traffic: 110,000 cruiser passengers (2012)
- Annual revenue: 21.5 billion RMB (2011)
- Net income: 1.678 billion RMB (2011)
- Website http://www.ptacn.com

The Port of Tianjin (Tianjin Gang, Chinese: 天津港; pinyin: tiānjīn gǎng), formerly known as the Port of Tanggu, is the largest port in Northern China and the main maritime gateway to Beijing. The name "Tianjin Xingang"(Chinese: 天津新港; pinyin: tiānjīn xīngǎng; lit. 'Tianjin New Port'), which strictly speaking refers only to the main seaport area, is sometimes used to refer to the whole port. The Port is located on the western shore of the Bohai Bay, centered on the estuary of the Haihe River, 170 km south east of Beijing and 60 km east of Tianjin city. It is the largest man-made port in mainland China, and one of the largest in the world. It covers 121 square kilometers of land surface, with over 31.9 km of quay shoreline and 151 production berths at the end of 2010.

== Business Structure and Planning ==
=== Ownership Structure ===
The ownership structure of the Tianjin Port after the 2009 merger. Green boxes are foreign-registered entities, blue boxes are mainland-registered

The Port of Tianjin is a state-owned enterprise (SOE), run as an independent corporation, with separate finances and a commercial orientation. The port owner is the Tianjin Municipality People's Government (天津市人民政), through the Tianjin SASAC (Tianjin State Assets Supervision and Administration Committee—天津国有资产监督管理委员会), which is the full owner of the Tianjin Port (Group) Company (TPG). TPG's board is appointed by the Tianjin government. TPG is the effective holding company and main Port Operator, and it owns or has a stake on the majority of the Port's various operating outfits.

Since the 2009 merger, TPG's main operating subsidiary is Tianjin Port Development Co. Ltd (TPD), which in turn is the majority shareholder of Tianjin Port Holdings Co. Ltd (TPC). TPG has been injecting operational assets to TPC for several years, and since 2009 to TPD (most recently the Shihua Crude Oil Terminal). This has created somewhat of a functional division. The listed TPD, directly or through TPC, controls all terminals and direct cargo-handling operations. TPG still directly controls most of the utility, support and ancillary units related to the Port, and retains control of strategic planning. TPG is also directly or indirectly a party in 53 joint ventures

=== Financing and Capital Structure ===
TPG is a fairly large size SOE: it has been a member of the China 500 Enterprises since 2004, one of only two port operators in the list. At the end of 2011, Tianjin Port Group's assets reached CN¥ 88.8 billion (up 12% from 2010), and fixed assets were worth CN¥ 13.5 billion (up 2.1%). Yearly operating income was CN¥ 21.5 billion (up 6.7%), and total added value reached CN¥ 7.2 billion (up 14.3%) Like most SOEs, it has been attempting to diversify its sources of financing, relying more on securities and new types of debentures.

Equity: The two main operator holding companies are listed. Tianjin Port Holdings Company Limited (天津港股份有限公司) was listed as an A share (SSE: 600717) on the Shanghai Stock Exchange in 1996. Tianjin Port Development Holdings Limited (天津港发展有限公司) was incorporated in the Cayman Islands and listed as a red chip stock (SEHK: 3382) on the Hong Kong Stock Exchange in 2005.

TPD (which as a Hong Kong listed company issues audited reports) in 2011 had an operating profit of HK$2,088,000,000 out of HK$16.548 billion of revenue. As of 30 June 2012, TPD had assets of HK$34.174 billion and HK$20.713 billion of total equity. Despite healthy indicators, both TPC and TPD stock has performed weakly for the last few years, probably reflecting the market's concerns about the potentially over-expanded port industry in China.

Bonds and borrowing: As of August 2012, TPG had a credit rating of AAA according to Dagong Global Credit Rating. TPG regularly issues short-term bonds for working capital replenishment, commonly in annual emissions of (bills worth CN¥ 3,000,000,000 in both 2011 and 2012).

Despite elevated capital investment, the Port is not heavily leveraged. On 30 June 2012, TPD had HK$9.454 billion of consolidated borrowings for a debt/equity ratio of 0.16 and gearing ratio of 45.6%, while its liquidity is somewhat low at a current ratio of 0.9 and quick ratio of 0.84. Cash flow from operations in 2011 was HK$2.604 billion, cash at reporting date was HK$4.575 billion.

Tianjin Port Finance Company operates as the in-house financial service provider for the Group. Besides basic services as discounting of commercial notes, bill settlement and payments clearing, the TJPFC redirect funds between units of the Group in the form of loans, which circumvents the legal prohibition of direct financial transfers between members of a conglomerate.

=== Business Model and Strategic Planning ===
Business Model: During the heyday of China's export-led growth, the core task of the port (like the rest of the Chinese logistic system) was simply to provide outlets for the export sector, and inlets for their raw materials. With demand for shipping growing exponentially, the task for the Port was to keep up, increasing capability as fast as possible by expanding channels, building more berths, enhancing cargo handling capability and improving its ability to process more complex cargoes, faster.

The slowdown of global trade following the 2008 crisis, and the very magnitude of the port industry expansion, have called the sustainability of this model into question. The clear and present danger of a major glut in capacity has created in China one of the fiercest competitive environment for ports in the world: margins have deteriorated throughout the industry, and capacity has kept on growing.

The reaction by Port has been to attempt to position itself as the dominant regional hub, and accept the need to diversify the Port's productive activities into "four industries": cargo handling, international logistics, port real estate and integrated services.

Strategic Planning: Tianjin Port great advantage lies in its role as the gateway to the Beijing-Tianjin megalopolis, and more widely as the beachhead for North China. The Port is also a key player in the (immensely ambitious) planning for the Tianjin Binhai New Area and the Bohai Rim area as a whole. The stated goal of the Twelfth Five Year Plan ("12-5") is to leverage that advantage into making the Port of Tianjin into the"Northern International Shipping and Logistic Center" (北方国际航运中心和国际物流中心) (Note: This language of "international logistics center" is used by at least nine Chinese ports, as part marketing slogan, part statement of purpose about their move into advanced service provision. Shanghai refers to itself with an unqualified "International Shipping and Logistics Center", Qingdao and Dalian use "Northeast Asia International Logistics Center", referring to their desired positioning as the core transshipment centers for the region. Tianjin's usage focuses on its claims its role as headwater for a sub-region.) which would serve as the hub of its hinterland in the Three Norths (三北, meaning China's Northwest, the North China Plain and Northeast), playing the lynchpin role that the Port of Rotterdam plays for the Rhine economic area.

Middle Term Plans: In expectation of a bad year for the shipping industry, TPG issued modest (compared to the recent past) growth targets for 2012: 470 million tonnes of total cargo and 12 M TEU. Long term targets remain bullish, with the 12-5 goal of reaching 560 million tonnes, 18 million TEU, 95 international container lines, 40 national cargo lines, and 100 cruises a year by 2015, an operating revenue of CN¥ 30 billion, fixed assets of CN¥ 74 billion and total assets of CN¥ 110 billion.

Long Term Plans: The long-term plans for the development of Tianjin Port are monumental in scale, consistent with the ambitious pace of change of the last decade. According to the "2010-2030 Comprehensive Plan for the Port of Tianjin", approved in late 2010, by 2020 Tianjin Port would extend from north (Hangu) to south (Dagang) for a distance of almost 90 km, with five independent shipping channels extending to the east all the way to the 23 m isobath line. By 2030, the planned land area of the Port will be 245 square km, with 200 km of quays and a staggering 390 deep-water production berths. If these plans are realized, almost the whole of the Tianjin Municipality coast will form a single, continuous port and logistic center built almost exclusively on reclaimed land, in all likelihood the largest artificial port on earth.

Tianjin Port Planning Map for 2030

== Port operations ==
The subsidiaries and partial-ownership partners of TPG are involved in all facets of port operation, including stevedoring, shipping agency, cargo handling, storage and transportation, infrastructure management, communications and information services, financial services, power supply, real estate development, health care, personnel training, education, port security, transportation, fire protection, port facilities management, environmental management, etc.

The core activity of the Port is, naturally, cargo handling and processing. As a comprehensive port, it handles all sort of cargoes, including dry and liquid bulk, general cargo, containers, vehicles, and passengers. Tianjin Port operates 365 days a year, 24 hours a day (on three shifts at 00:00–08:00, 08:00–16:00 and 16:00–24:00).

=== Port production ===
Docking terminals and wharves: As of 2011, the Port had 217 berths (including service berths); 90 berths were capable of accommodating ships over 10,000 DWT. Of these, 72 could dock ships over 50,000 DWT; 30 over 100,000 DWT, 23 over 150,000 DWT, 5 over 200,000 DWT, and 2 over 300,000 DWT.

The Port's docking terminals are operated by autonomous companies that are mostly either fully owned by, or are joint ventures with, TPC or TPD. While the 2004 Port Law allowed full foreign ownership of port facilities, TPG is still the majority shareholder of all but a few of the Port's main terminals, excepting single-company (customs type II) terminals. Additional stevedoring personnel is provided by a number of labor services companies affiliated to various operators.

Secondary wharves tend to the service, supply and maintenance ships that a complex port needs to function. These facilities range from temporary sand unloading wharves, needed for construction, to large bunkering wharves, workboat stations and the bases of the various law enforcement agencies.

Scheduling and Dispatching: The Tianjin Port Group's Operations Department (天津港集团业务部) is in charge of coordinating the productive operation of the Port, and must be informed of all ship movements and major operations. The production schedule (ship movement plan) is arranged by the TPG Dispatch Control Center (天津港集团生产调度指中心), in coordination with the wharf operators, the MSA, and the pilot center. The Dispatch Center organizes ship movements, tracks pilotage operations, and supervises terminal operations via real-time CCTV monitoring. The Dagukou port area has a separate dispatching center (天津临港经济区船舶调度指挥中心).

Foreign flag ships must engage a shipping agency, and the agency has responsibility of communicating with the Operations Department directly, giving notice of the vessel name and registration, nature of the ship, ship specifications, captain, goods type and quantity, and special needs (such as traffic diversion, tugs) 72 and 24 hours prior to arrival. Departures and in-harbor ship movements must be notified before 1130 on the day prior to movement (the planning day runs from 1800 to 1800). Emergency and short-notice movements require special permission.

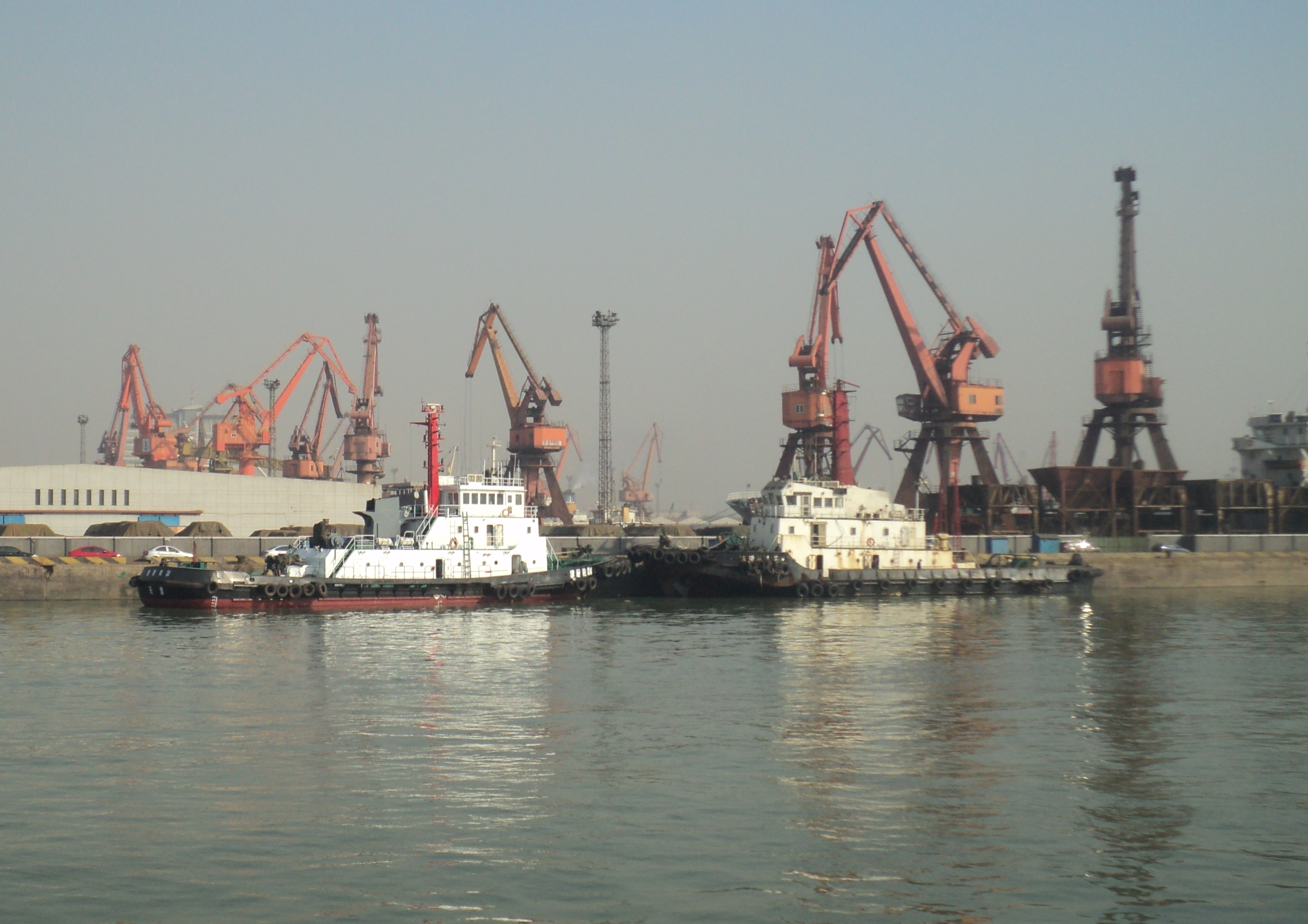
Two harbor tugs at the First Pier Tug Wharf

Harbor Craft: The main provider of harbor craft is the Tianjin Port Tug & Lighter Company. The TTLC operates the harbor tugs, fireboats, pilot boats and other ancillary craft such as the crew boat Xinbinhai, or the sightseeing boat Xinhaimen (used for inspection and visiting VIPs). The company operates 26 harbor tugs (between 2,600 HP and 6,000 HP of power), 5 pilot ships, 7 other ancillary crafts, 2 floating cranes (120 t and 200 t capacity); and around three dozen lighters, the largest around 1,340 t displacement. The Dagusha channel is served by a subsidiary company of TTLC, the Tianjin Lingang Tug Company (天津临港拖轮有限公司), operating four tugboats.

Other work vessels: CNOOC Bohai Oil maintains a flotilla of 110 offshore support vessels (OSV), many homeported at Tianjin. These boats are available for emergency work under MSA authority. Two of CNOOC's floating cranes (800 tonnes and 500 tonnes) can be commercially engaged for harbor duty.

=== Port maintenance and construction ===
Facilities management: TPG operates as the port landlord, and provides most utilities, municipal services and ancillary services to the various port operators. The services it provides are very wide in scope, spanning everything from electrical power, to construction materials, to printing services. The main organ of TPG's landlord function is the Tianjin Port Facilities Management Company (天津港设施管理服务公司), which manages and maintains all municipal services —including roads, railroads, bridges, water, and sewerage—, installs and maintains wharf equipment and other production material, provides municipal administration, and provides engineering consultancy services.

Hydrographic Surveying and Charting: As an artificial port dependent on dredged channels susceptible to silting, continuous depth surveying is critical to the Port. Tianjin Port is the base of the Beihai Navigational Security Center's Tianjin Marine Survey and Charting Center (北海航海保障中心天津海事测绘中心) with responsibility for the hydrographic surveying, monitoring, fairway sounding and charting of all waters and shipping channels in the Beihai (Northern Seas) area, which includes the Bohai and Yellow seas. As of 2011, the Hydrographic Brigade had 149 personnel, two survey ships (Haice 051 and Haice 0502), surveying equipment including ROVs, and UAVs for aerial surveying

Channel maintenance: The Tianjin Dredging Company (天津航道局) is the organic waterway management company of the Tianjin Port Group. As of January 2010, the TDC deployed 100 boats, and had the largest dredging capacity of China, with a capacity of 300 million cubic meters and more than 500,000 kW of vessel power. Despite these numbers, the scale of fairway expansion and land reclamation in the Port means that several other construction companies operate large numbers of dredging vessels as well.

Dredging the Haihe Channel is the responsibility of the Tianjin Municipal Water Management Bureau (天津市水务局), which maintains both navigability and river flow capacity (set at 800 m^{3}/s). The Water Management dredgers operate from wharves at the Haihe Second Barrier and at the Haihe Tidal Barrier.

Icebreaking: Routine icebreaking is usually handled by the Tug & Lighter Company. In case of ice emergencies, the MSA coordinates icebreaking patrols, using heavy harbor tugs and dredges. During the frozen winter of 2010–11, the Port authorities estimated that there were 16 ships with icebreaking capabilities available, 10 of which belonged to the TTLC. CNOOC Bohai had 24 icebreakers, needed to clear offshore platforms, and also lent two larger icebreakers to the Port.

Port Construction: The Port's main construction and engineering outfit is CCCC First Harbor Engineering (中交第一航务工程局有限公司). Four subsidiary companies carry out all forms of project engineering and construction, from roads to breakwaters. As of 2010, First Harbor Engineering First Company (the main boat outfit) had a fleet of 74 work vessels. As in the case of dredgers, the sheer scale of construction in the Port means that many other outfits deploy hundreds of vessels. As of 2008, there were 418 construction vessels operating at the Port, including 236 sand barges and fluvial workboats.

The Tianjin Research Institute for Water Transport Engineering is in charge of the technical supervision of most port engineering projects.

Real Estate Development: Commercial and residential property development in newly reclaimed or repurposed land is one of the four core "industries" of the Port. The Tianjin Port Real Estate Development Company (天津港地产发展有限公司), founded 2009, is now very active in developing both residential and commercial property on Port land. Apart from the commercial property in Dongjiang and the Container Logistics Center, there are three major residential projects under way, with several others planned: the Vanke Harbor City project in the Container Logistics Center covers 148,483 m^{2} (373,707 m^{2} built area). The Kaihanxuan (瞰海轩) housing project in Dongjiang covers 86,000 m^{2}, (250,000 m^{2} built area). The Tingtaoyuan (听涛苑) project in the Bulk Logistics Center covers an area of 80,000 m^{2} (150,000 m^{2} built area).

=== Services and amenities ===
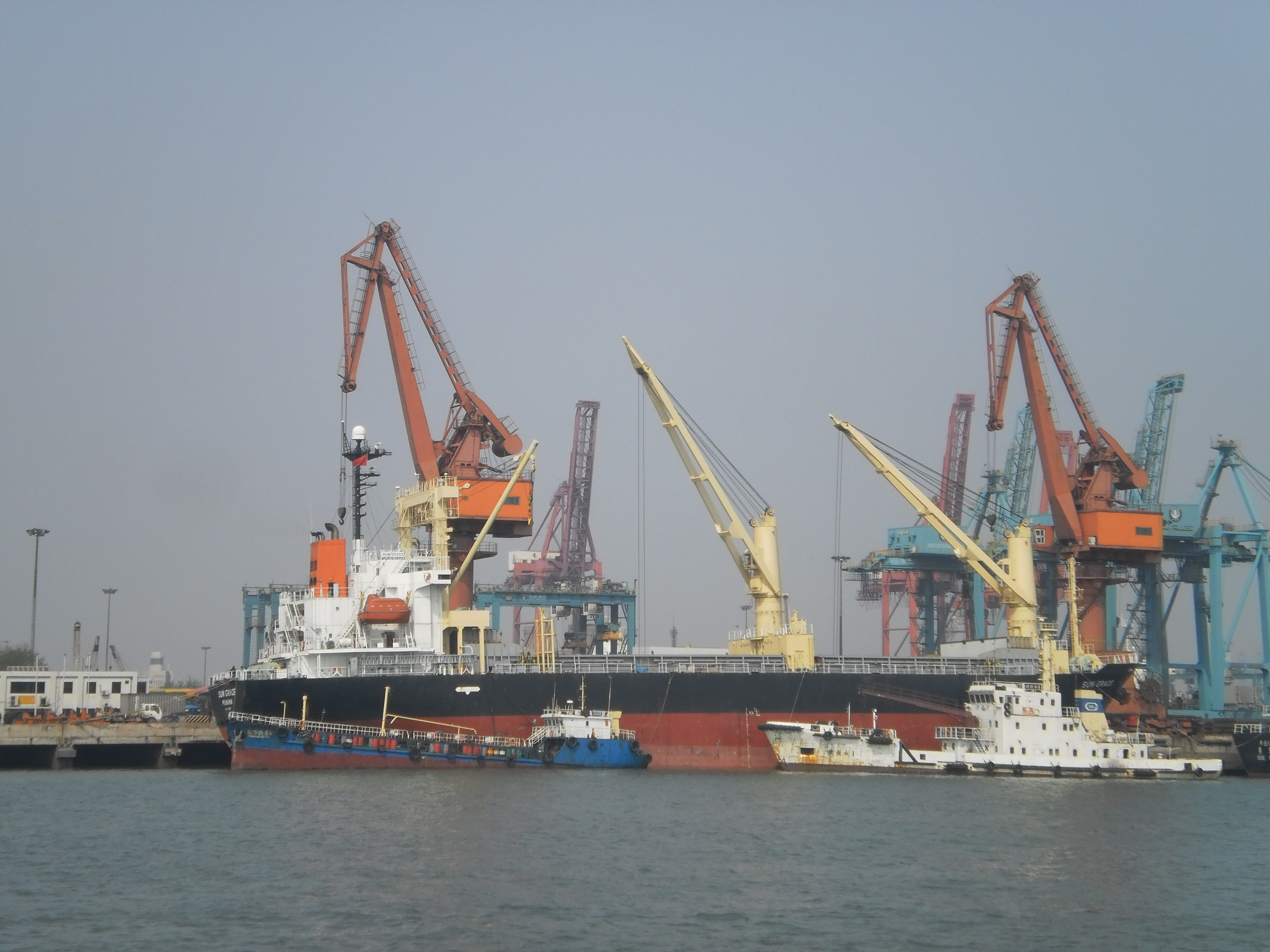
A water tender and a bunker tender resupplying a freighter at the First Stevedoring Co. wharf.

Bunkerage: The main bunker oil, lubricants and water provider in Tianjin Port is Tianjin Chimbusco (中国船舶燃料供应天津公司). Chimbusco China had a monopoly on the supply of bonded bunker oil (i.e. for foreign vessels) in China until 2006. Tianjin Chimbusco (now a TPG subsidiary) retained its exclusive rights in Tianjin until 2009, and the end of the monopoly resulted in a black gold rush of competing bunkerage companies: Sinopec Zhoushan entered the Tianjin market in October 2010, followed in December 2010 by SinoBunker, and in June 2011, by China Changjiang Bunker. This sudden rise in competition resulted in a serious price war and crashing prices in 2011. Most forms of maritime fuels are available, primarily IFO 180 cSt and 380 cSt; IFO 120 cSt, MDG, MDO and other diesels are available. Bunkering operations are done by fuel tender, as most berths do not have fueling equipment. Drinking water is mostly delivered by tender.

Chandlery and Supplies: Several dozen ship chandlers are capable of supplying all necessary deck, engine and cabin stores, and all other provisions both at berth or at anchorage. The oldest international chandler is Tianjin Ocean Shipping Supply company (天津市外轮供应公司), owned by the Tianjin government. Most spare parts are available locally, and special orders can be flown in easily.

Cleaning and Sanitation Services: Bilge, slops and ballast water disposal is a major pollution hazard for the Bohai Bay, and it is tightly regulated by the MSA. Only specially authorized enterprises can engage in their removal and disposal, or in tank cleanup. Nevertheless, illegal dumping of ballast water is a persistent problem and one of the Port's major law enforcement challenges. Ships carrying oil or liquid chemicals, and all ships over 10,000 gt are required to sign an "Agreement for Ship Pollution Response" with one of four authorized emergency spill response companies.

Tianjin Port Harbor Service Company (天津港港口服务公司) is the Group's organic "housekeeping" service, providing cabin, hold and bedding clean-up, and garbage disposal for ships at berth. Other companies are available for all sorts of cleaning, disinfection and deck maintenance, fifteen companies are authorized for ship garbage collection.

Seafarers: As the port of a major city, facilities available to crews on shore leave are extensive, if somewhat difficult to reach. The International Seamen's Club (天津新港国际海员俱乐部) is located at Xingang Liumi Road, opposite the Bomesc shipyard. Around two dozen crew management companies provide replacement crews at all times.

=== Ship repair and shipbuilding facilities ===
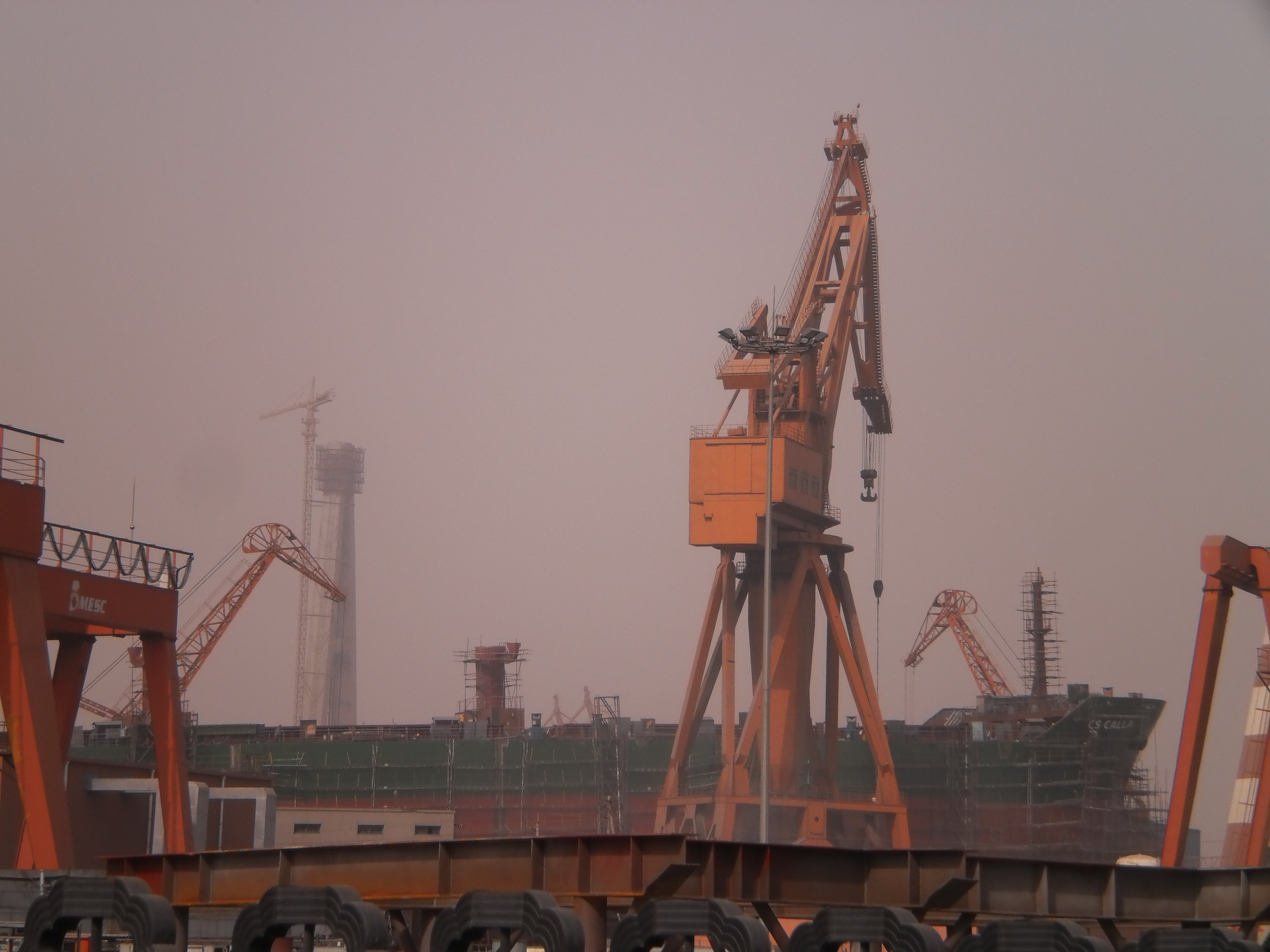
A ship under construction at the Bomesc Fabrication Site

Tianjin Port has several ship repair and shipbuilding facilities capable of carrying out almost all forms of ship repair and refitting for all but the largest ships, and those capabilities are increasing rapidly.

The Tanggu port area was one of the earliest modern shipbuilding areas of China. The still-functioning Taku Dockyard (now the Tianjin City Shipyard) was founded in 1880, and is the oldest modern dockyard in Northern China. Many small shipyards operated in the Haihe region, but most have closed in recent years, or will soon close to make way for the large development projects of the Binhai Urban Core.

The main ship repair facility in the port is the CSIC Tianjin Xingang Shipyard. Founded in 1939, it is located at the very end of the main harbor basin, right next to the Haihe shiplock. Immediately next to it is the CCCC Bomesc Maritime Industry's facility (built in 2007). On the Nanjiang region, Singapore's Sembawang Shipyard entered in 1997 to the first foreign joint shipyard project in China, in partnership with Bohai Oil. That shipyard is now the CNOOC Bohai Oil BOHIC subsidiary.

Currently under construction in the Lingang area is the Xingang Shipbuilding and Repair Base, an L-shaped facility built around Basin 1 of the Dagukou harbor. Its two main dry docks will be capable of building ships up to 500,000DWT and 300,000DWT respectively, capable of building the largest VLCC and VLOC in service. Once the Base is fully operational in 2015, it is expected to be able to yearly produce up to 5,000,000 DWT of new vessel construction, repair 200 ships, and have sales of over US$2 billion. The first two dry docks are already completed and operational, and in 2011 produced 18 ships of 57,000 DWT or less. The Xingang Shipyard will fully relocate to this new location once it is complete. Bomesc and the Xinhe Shipyard are also building shipbuilding/repair bases in the Lingang area facilities, and it is hoped by the Tianjin development authorities that Lingang will become the largest shipbuilding cluster in North China.

A large number of ship repair companies offer maintenance services at berth, and the Tianjin Wuzhou Marine Service Engineering Co. (天津五洲海事工程有限公司) offers anchorage and under-way repairs using its specialized ship Jinyuanhangxiu 1 (津远航修1号), one of only five such vessels in China.

Shipyards
Shipyard	Port Area	Quayside	Berths	Graving Docks	Floating Dock	Slipways	Cranage	Area	Capacity	Comments												
CSIC Tianjin Xingang Shipyard (天津新港船舶重工有限责任公司)	Beijiang	1,100 m, (−6 m)	6	3,000 t (104×17×8.5 m); 25,000 t (212×28×10.85 m)	155×30×9.4 m	40,000 t and 15,000 t	1x200 t, 1x150 t, 2x75 t, 5x25 t, 4x15 t, 2x75 t; Craneship 1x300 t; Floating Crane 1x60 t.	Area	vessels up to 30,000 DWT new construction	3 tugs (1,670 hp, 2,000 hp, 700 hp)												
CCCC Bomesc (天津中交博迈科海洋船舶重工有限公司)	Beijiang	Quayside	120 m; 240 m			1x150 t; 1x80 t; 11x50 t	11 ha	?														
Tianjin Marine Engineering Shipyard (中港集团天津船舶工程船厂)	Haihe	360 m −7 m	1x3,000 DWT	3,000 t	n/a	10,000 m^{2}	?	20.6 ha	100 repairs/yr, 20,000 t of steel; 600,000 t throughput		Formerly the Huanhai Shipyard (天津航道局环海船厂)											
Tianjin City Shipyard (天津市船厂)	Haihe	530 m		3,000 t; 1,000 t	0	0	1 tug 400 hp	2.66 ha	?	Founded in 1880 as the Taku Dockyard.												
CSSC Xinhe Shipyard (天津新河船舶重工有限责任公司造船厂)	Haihe	500 m	275 m	6,000 t	Floating Dock	1x7,000 t; 7x1,000 t	1x70 t; 1x50 t; 2x30 t; 6x25 t; 6x15 t; 2x10 t	63 ha	?	Vessels under 7,000 DWT												
CNOOC Engineering Offshore Tanggu Fabrication Yard (海洋石油工程塘沽建做场地)	Nanjiang	400m, −5m	Berths	n/a	n/a	8,000 t 78 m; 4,000 t 135m ; 2,000 t 115 m; 4,000 t 150m; 1,800 t 138 m	?	20 ha	60,000 t steel/yr	Offshore Engineering, Oil Platforms												
Bohai Oil Heavy Industry Co. Ltd. (BOHIC) (天津渤海石油重工有限公司)	Nanjiang	800 m	3	25,000 DWT 156x42 m	Demolished 2009	n/a	2x25 t 2x15 t 1 tug 400 hp	?	?	Previously Sembawang Bohai Shipyard.												
CSIC Tianjin Lingang Shipbuilding and Repair Base (中船重工天津临港造修船基地)	Dagukou	3,900 m	707 m; 150 m	520x110x13.3 m 440x80x13.3 m; 320x52x13.5 m 360x66x13.5 m	80,000 DWT	1	1x600 t; ?	350 ha	3 Mt new construction; 200 repairs; 4 ocean engineering sets	Under construction												
Bomesc 2nd Fabrication Base	Dagukou	800 m	760 m (−12 m)	?	n/a	3,000 t, 6,000 t, 10,000 t	?	30 ha	?	Under Construction												
Tianjin Lingang Xinhe Shipbuilding & Ship Repair Base (天津临港工业区新河船厂修船基地)	Dagukou	?	?	1x300,000 t; 1x100,000 t	n/a	n/a	1x70 t; 2x40 t	47 ha	150 vessels/year	Under Construction	=	Tianma Shipbreaking Yard (天津天马拆船工程有限公)	Beitang	1,031 m	3	282x55 m	0	0	2x16 t, 1x25 t, 1x40 t	5 ha	150,000 t metal	Limited building, refitting and rebuilding capacities.

=== Trade and shipping services ===
One of the strategic goals of the Port is to increase its high value-added services business, providing advance support for all forms of logistic activities.

The Tianjin International Trade and Shipping Service District (天津 与航运服务区) is located in the North Basin area of the Beijiang port area, south of the Tianjin Port Container Logistics Center, and adjacent to the business and services district of TEDA. The Service District is 900 m east–west and 700 m north–south, for a total of 88 hectares, (which will expand to 100 hectares long-term). The Service District is composed of nine high-rise buildings, including the TPG main office building and the International Shipping Service Center.

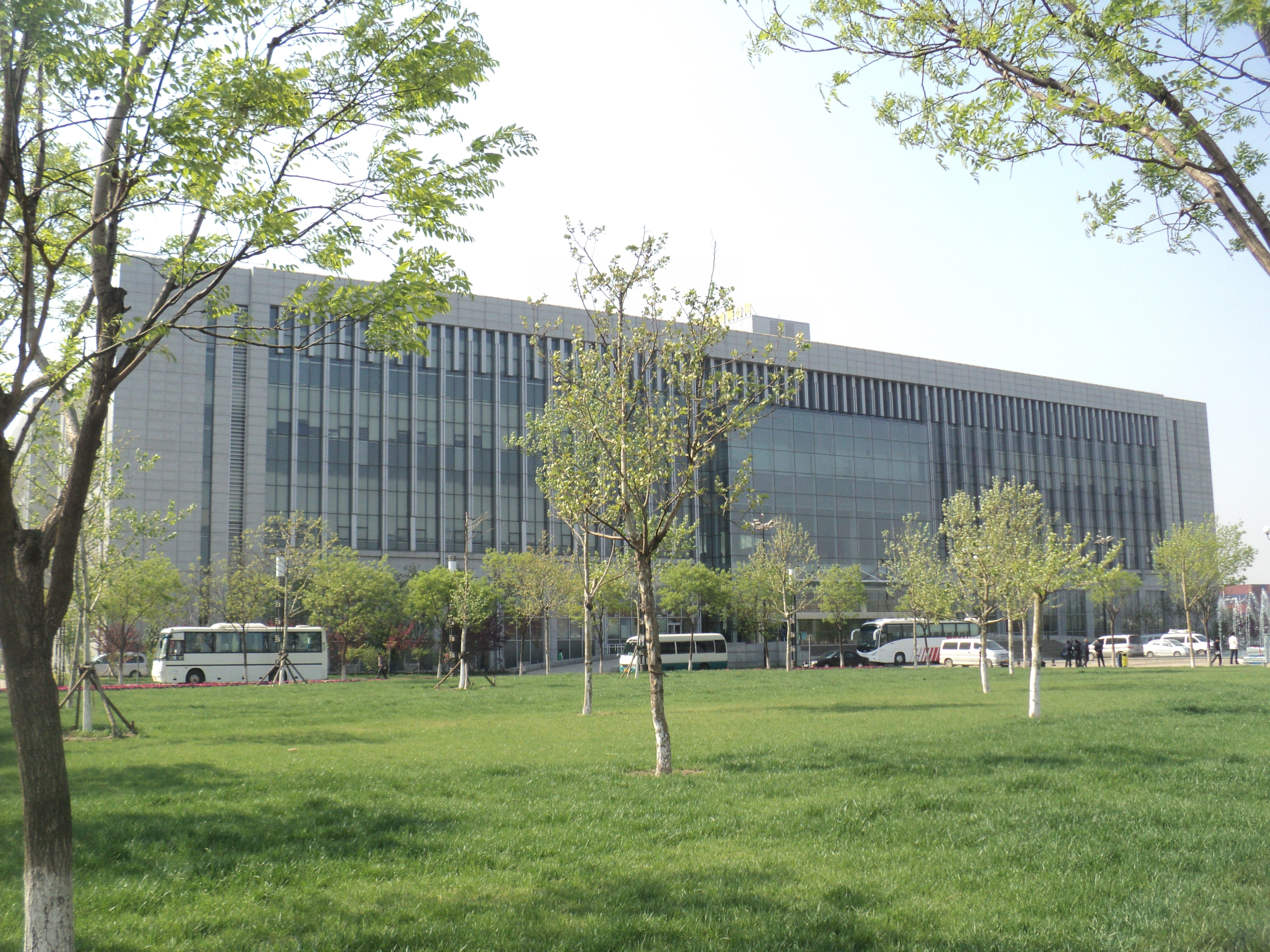
The Tianjin Port International Trade and Shipping Service Center.

The Tianjin International Trade and Shipping Service Center (天津国际贸易与航运服务中心) provides "one-stop" service for all sorts of aspects of shipping and trade, with a core mission of centralizing and streamlining the clearance process. The center was put into operation on 7 November 2005, and moved to its current purpose-built, 59,000 m^{2} building in 2007. The Center aggregates 270 government service windows from 14 government agencies, including customs, inspection and quarantine, maritime safety, border control, traffic control, maritime court, electronic customs clearance, business taxes, and state audit and supervision. Other services present include personnel exchange and labor management, various TPG companies, banks and insurers, trading and shipping companies, logistics operators, legal services, and cargo and shipping agents. A total of 70 organizations with 1,380 employees operate in the center. The TJITSC also runs the Tianjin Shipping Index (天津航运指数), which provides shipping cost data for all of North China.

The Dongjiang shipping services area is still under development, and aims to form a cluster of specific shipping services. Taking advantage of its favorable tax and currency exchange regime, the Dongjiang Bonded Port intends to attract a cluster of enterprises related to the financing of ship leasing and shipbroking, and to other forms of shipping financing, including offshore financial services, offshore banking, marine insurers and P&I clubs, ship registration, local offices of the leading classification societies, etc. The Dongjiang Northern International Shipping Exchange (东疆北方国际航运交易所) is a comprehensive platform for the trading of freight and logistic services in all the "five functions" of the Dongjiang Bonded Port. It started operations in April 2009.

Shipping Agencies: Engaging a shipping agent is mandatory for all foreign flagged ships, and Tianjin has several dozen such outfits operating at present. The largest agents are Tianjin Penavico (天津外轮代理公司), owned by TPG, and Tianjin Sinoagent (天津船务代理有限公司), a subsidiary of Tianjin Sinotrans. Agencies have fairly extensive obligations as intermediaries for most paperwork procedures involving TPG, ship operators, or government agencies, as well as their traditional duties of arranging ship supply and cargo handling.

== Passenger services ==
=== Passenger terminals ===
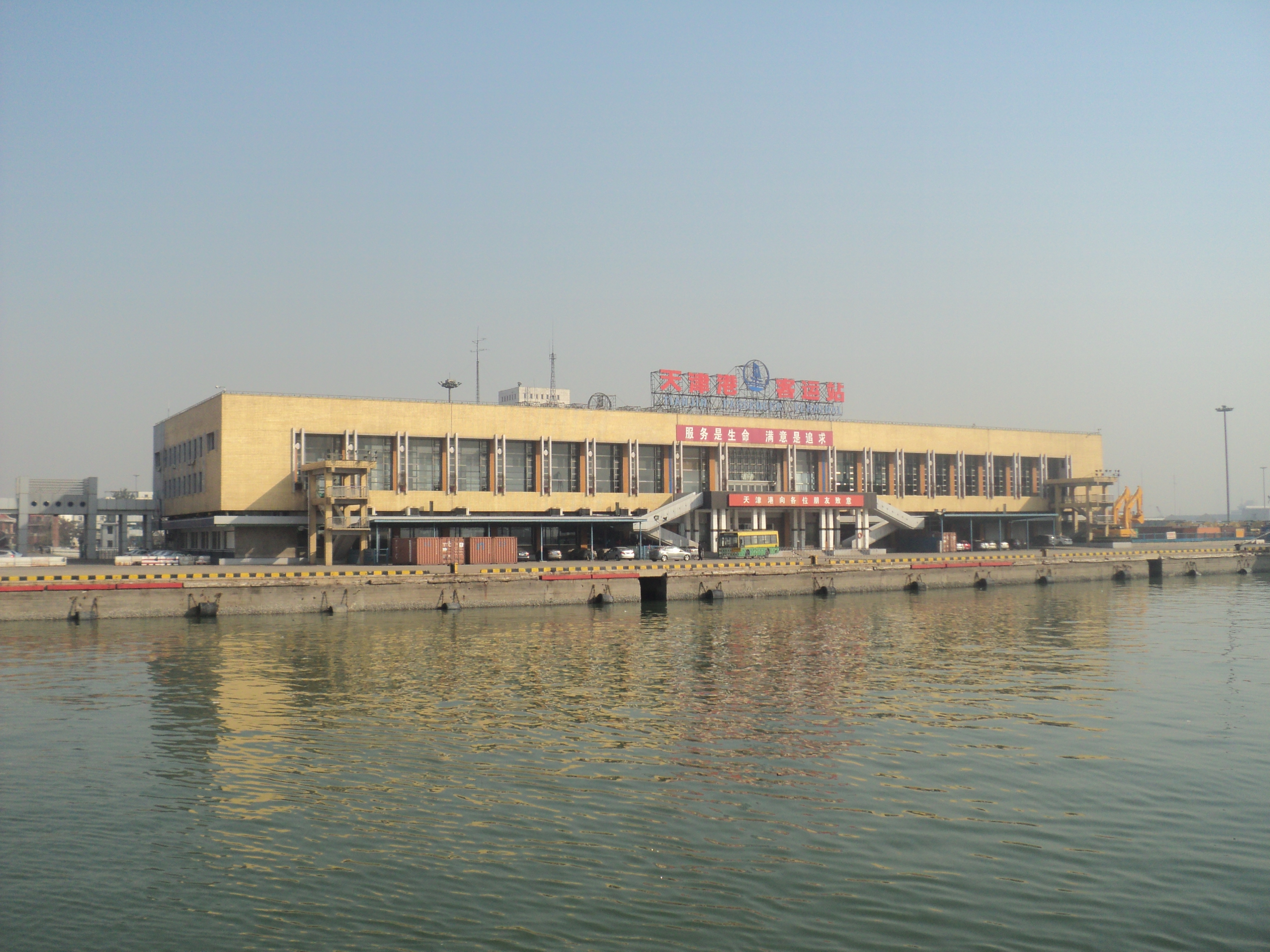
The Tianjin Xingang Passenger Terminal

The Tianjin Xingang Passenger Terminal (天津新港客运站) is located at the western end of the Beijiang area, immediately next to the Bomesc Shipyard. It is run by the Tianjin Passenger Company, a subsidiary of the Tianjin Port Group. The Terminal used to be the berth for visiting pleasure cruises, but since the opening of the Tianjin Homeport in July 2010, the Terminal serves only ferry services and coastal cruises. The terminal and ancillary buildings have 15,000 m^{2}of built surface. The terminal has 3 berths of 8–12 m depth that can serve passenger ships, Ro-Ro ferries, car carriers and cruise ships. The K-1 Berth (the westernmost berth of the terminal) has a floating bridge that provides all-tide service to Ro-Ro vessels. It is also the most common loading berth for harbor pilots.

Two main regular ferry lines leave Tianjin, serviced by a fleet of two Ro-Ro ferry boats. There is one international destination, Incheon in South Korea, and one national destination, Dalian in Liaoning Province. The route to Kobe in Japan was discontinued in 2013. The ships and general route schedules are as follows:

Ferry Lines from Tianjin
Ship Name	Ship Type	Displacement	Measurements	Speed	Passengers	Destination	Leaves Tianjin	Arrives Destination	Leaves	Arrives Tianjin	Notes
Putuodao (普陀岛)	Ro-ro car ferry	16,234 DWT	137x23.4x5.6 m	21 knots	1,428	Dalian	Tu Th Sa 1900		Mo We Fr Su 1800		From mid-Jun to Sep
Tianren (天仁)	Ro-ro car ferry	12521	188.5x24.8x6.91 m	25.2 knots	544	Inchon	Th & Fr		We & Sa		
Yanjing (燕京)	Ro-ro car ferry	9960 DWT	135x20 m	20 knots	442	Kobe	Mo 1100	We 1400	Fr 1200	Su 1400	165 TEU. Discontinued.

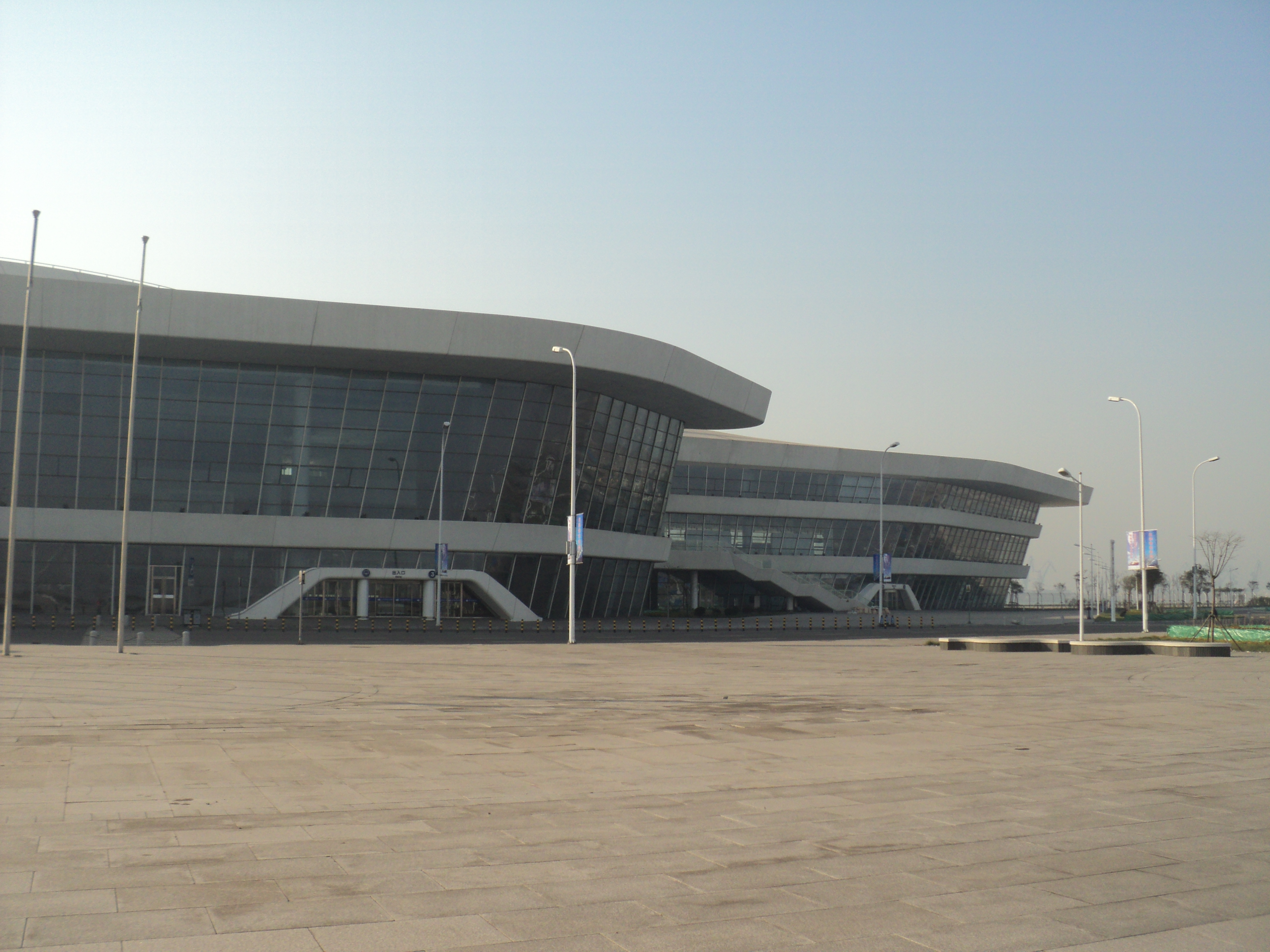
Tianjin Cruise Homeport

The new Tianjin Cruise Homeport started operation in the summer of 2010. It is located in the southern tip of the Dongjiang peninsula, at a 120 hectares development area that is expected to become a tourist complex including resorts, hotels and duty-free shopping centers. The all-services terminal building, designed by China Construction Design International (CCDI), is a large white GFRC-clad building designed to mimic the flow of white silk on an ocean breeze. The 60,000 m^{2} terminal houses port administration, shipping agencies, restaurants, hotels and other services, and its migration and custom facilities are capable of processing 4,000 passengers at a time, for an annual capacity of 500,000 passengers. At present, the Homeport has two berths capable of accommodating ships up to 220,000 gt —enough to receive even the largest current cruisers.

The Tianjin Cruise Homeport is the fourth cruise homeport in China, the first in Northern China, and currently the largest in Asia. It will be capable of providing all the bunkering, resupplying and maintenance needs of its homeported cruise ships. Two major cruise companies, Costa Cruises and Royal Caribbean International, use Tianjin as homeport for their cruises in Asia. Two cruisers, Costa's Costa neoRomantica and Royal Caribbean's Legend of the Seas will be homeported at Tianjin during the summer. The Homeport's wharf is being extended by 350 m and refitted with Ro-Ro capabilities to also serve as a ferry port, as a car import wharf during winters, and as a military vehicles loading berth, for a capacity of 40,000 vehicles/year.

=== Leisure services ===
Yachting marinas: To exploit the pent-up demand for yachting services among China's newly wealthy, there are three large-scale marina projects underway at the Tianjin Port. The business plans and targeted public of these projects are in flux, and vary frequently.

1. The Binhai Ocean One Yachting Club (滨海一洋游艇会) is being built at the southern end of the Dongjiang Scenic Area's artificial beach. It is planned to become a yachting port with 700 berths, plus an extra 200 pile mooring slots. The first 71 berths are supposed to be completed by the end of 2012. The associated yachting club will be part of the Dongjiang entertainment complex, and target leisure users.
2. The Sino-Australia Royal Yacht City (中澳皇家游艇城)is a 1,000-berth development (to be completed in 2012) in the Tianjin Central Fishing Port. This project intends to create a "Northern Yacht Industrial Center" that clusters yacht manufacturing, sales and marinas all in one. At present, its club intends to target the wealthiest clienteles.
3. The Hi-speed Tianjin Yacht City (海斯比天津游艇城) in the Binhai Tourist Area plans to add 3,000 berths, focusing on high-speed boats, sailboats and high-performance yachts. The 66.7 ha site will include diving services, yacht rentals, sport fishing, racing events, and other sport and leisure activities.

In 2011, the MSA set up a specialized Yachting Management Center (天津海事局游艇管理中心) to separate the control of leisure traffic from commercial traffic, and new regulations will be introduced prior to the full opening of the above marinas (at present, yachts in China must operate under commercial boat rules, which severely hamper their flexibility).

Sightseeing tours: Two companies offer short (30-45min) boat tours of the harbor, traveling to the end of the Chuanzhadong channel. The first, Tianjin Port Haiyi Travel Service Company (天津港海颐旅行社公司), a TPG subsidiary, runs the sightseeing boat Haiyi (海颐号) from the K1 berth of the Passenger Terminal, with capacity for 132 passengers (CN¥ 30 as of November 2011). The second, Tianjin Haihe Jinlu Sightseeing Boats Company (天津海河津旅游船公司) operates from the Sightseeing Boats Pier at the other side of the main basin. It runs two ships, the Haijing (海景号) with capacity for 150 passengers and the Jinhai (津海号) with capacity for 184 passengers. CN¥ 50 as of April 2011.

== Transportation and logistics ==
Storage, transportation and all forms of logistics processing are the core activity of the Port, and it is no surprise that the majority of its land surface is dedicated to storage and processing facilities, with several million km^{2} of storage yards, warehouses and tank farms operated by dozens of enterprises. There are two large-scale purpose-built logistics areas designed to provide support and facilities to the operating logistics outfits.

The chief logistics unit of the Port Group is Tianjin Logistics Development Co. , established in 2009 by merging the Tianjin Port Storage and Distribution Company (天津港货运公司) with other Group logistics assets. TLD runs 1,800,000 m^{2} of storage yard, with a capacity for 32,000 TEU of containers, and is responsible for the establishment and management of the dry port network and the establishment of intermodal routes, as well as being the principal drayage provider.

=== Transportation corridors ===
China MSA's Seaways Plan for the Bohai Sea. Planned routes follow closely the seaways currently in use

Sea Routes: Two main sea routes connect the Bohai Bay with the Yellow Sea and the open ocean. These two routes carry the large majority of all traffic in an out of the Bohai Sea, and can be very crowded. The main deep water route (6 NM wide) goes from the Laotieshan Channel (38°36.1′ N/120°51.3′ E) at a 276° bearing until reaching a Traffic Separation Scheme south of Caofeidian (38°48.0′ N/118°45.2′ E), and can be quite a crowded waterway. A second main route (3 NM wide westward, 3 NM wide eastward) goes westward from Changshan channel (38°05.0′ N/120°24.6′ E) at a 293.5° bearing up to a point north of oil platform BZ28-1 (38°21.0′ N/119°38.5′ E), continuing at a 291° bearing up to the south of Caofedian Head (38°38.7′ N/118°38.4′ E) and then into the Xingang Main Channel. The eastward route goes from the Tianjin Xingang Main Channel to the Caofeidian Headlands, then follows at a 116° bearing to a point south of platform BZ28-1 (38°15.5′ N/119°38.5′ E) then at a 107° bearing to the Changshan Channel (38°05.0′ N/120°24.6′ E). A number of coastal routes connect the various ports within the Bohai sea, forming a circumbohai network.

Internal Waterways: The three main port areas are fairly poorly connected by road, requiring rather long detours to transport any cargo or equipment between them. While several bridges and tunnels directly linking Dongjiang with Beijiang and Nanjiang areas are projected for future development, these are still in early planning stages. To help relieve this internal bottleneck, in April 2010 the Port introduced a lighter route connecting Nanjiang (N-10 berth) and Beijiang (Tianjin Container Terminal), using one heavy barge (7800 DWT, 200 TEU). Another regular lighter route connecting Beijiang with Dongjiang was established in September 2010.

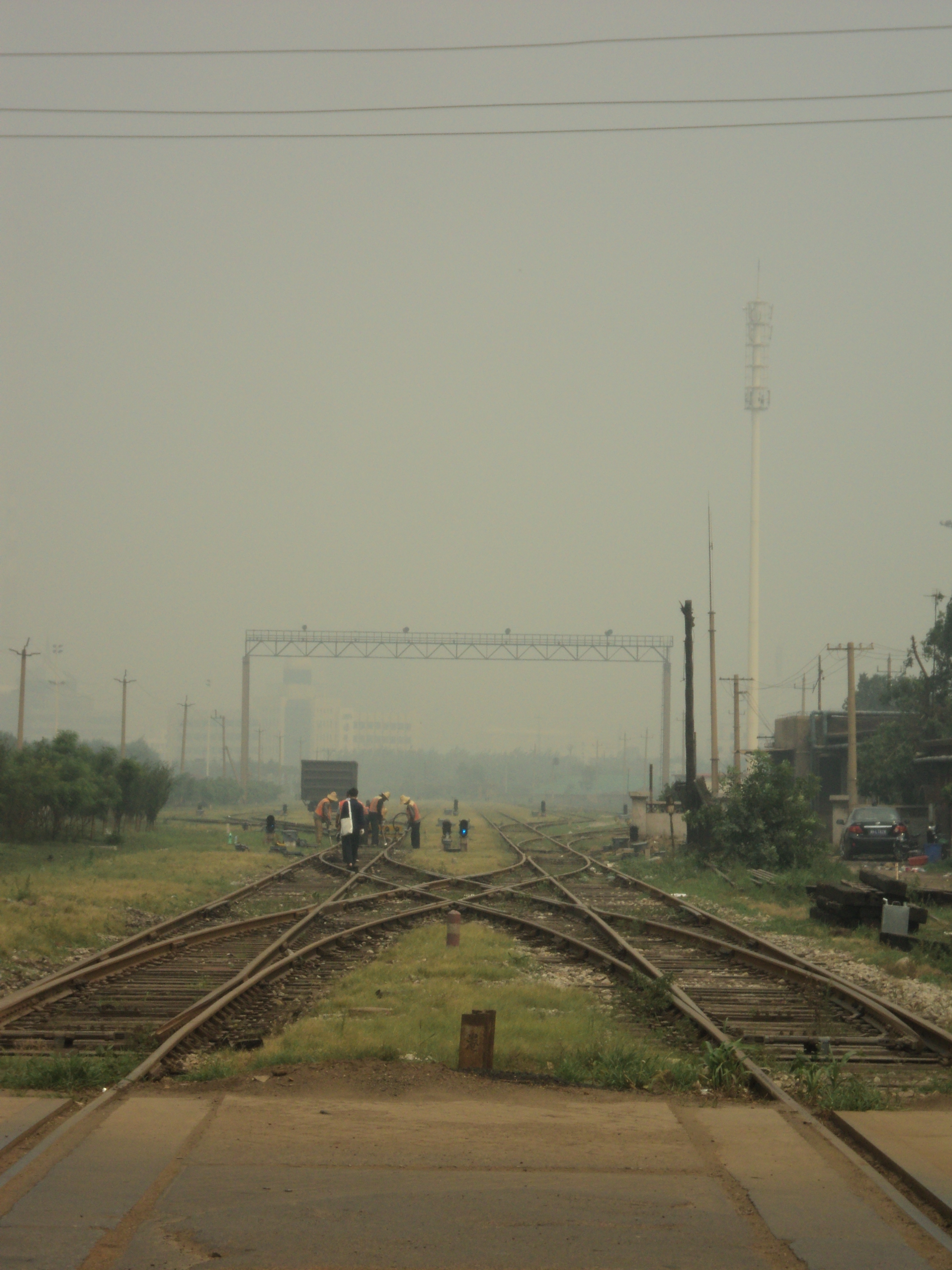
Internal port railroad approaching the Fourth Stevedoring Company wharf on the Beijiang Third Pier.

Railroads: Two main lines (First and Second Port Railroads: 进港一二线) service the Beijiang and Nanjiang areas respectively. The Jinji Railway connects these lines as a de facto ring railroad. A web of around 60 km of internal railways goes deep into the wharves and storage yards of the Beijiang area. The Nanjiang area is primarily connected through the Nanjiang Rail Bridge. This bridge was expanded to double-track in 2010, for an annual capacity of 70 million tonnes. A second bridge is under construction. A conveyor belt corridor runs parallel to the railway, carrying coal and ore to the Bulk Logistics Center.

A major expansion of intermodal capacity will come with the completion of the Third Port Railway (进港三线) project servicing Dongjiang and the Container Logistics Center. The new line will terminate at the Tianjin Xingang North Railway Container Central Station (天津新港北铁路集装箱中心站), which is located in 140 ha of land in the Dongjiang area, directly north of the Huicheng terminal, and is expected to be completed in 2013. The Xingang North Station will be purpose-built for the intermodal transfer and management of containers, and it will be supported by a new large automated marshalling yard in Beitang (北塘西编组站).

Highways and Roads: The internal roads in the Port carry an enormously heavy, noisy and noisome flow of traffic, and traffic jams are not uncommon at certain bottlenecks. The internal roads at the three main Port areas form a broken grid pattern, the east–west roads connecting with the expressways that feed the port. The main north–south roads are the Yuejin road transfixing the Container Logistics Center, the Meizhou (Americas) Road in the Dongjiang Area.

The backbone road of the Port is the S11 Haibin Expressway (海滨高速), which runs north–south and roughly represents the Port's western boundary. (Note: As the expressway follows the original coastline, most of the land east of the road is reclaimed land, including most of the Port.) The main east–west feeder roads are the S40 Jingjintang Expressway (京津塘高速), which merges into the Jingmen road; the S13 Jinbin Expressway ( 津滨高速) and the G103 Highway, which both merge into the Xingang Fourth Road; and the S30 Jingjin Expressway (京津高速), which becomes the Jishuanggang road and then the Xingang 8th Road into Dongjiang. In the south, the Tianjin Avenue and the S50 Jinpu Expressway (津浦高速) connect into the Nanjiang and Lingang areas.

These feeder roads connect in turn with the thick Beijing-Tianjin road hub, with seven radial expressways from Beijing and four from Tianjin. Of these, the Jinji Expressway (S1) is the main alternative route into Beijing (through Pinggu) and the Northwest (through the 6th Ring Road and the G6 Jingla Expressway), while the G25 Changzhen Expressway is the main north–south connector.

Airports: The port is 30 min away from Tianjin Binhai International Airport, and 120 min from Beijing Capital International Airport. Two small general aviation aerodromes —Tanggu Airport (塘沽机场) and Binhai Eastern General Heliport (滨海东方通用直升机场)— provide offshore helicopter shuttles and other services to Port operators.

=== Logistics centers, yards and warehouses ===
Map of the Tianjin Port Container Logistics Center

The Tianjin Port Container Logistics Center (天津港集装箱物流中心) is located in the north part of the Beijiang area, in 7.03 km^{2} of reclaimed land. The center currently hosts 42 logistics enterprises, and it has 350 hectares of yard space, 26 hectares of warehouses, or about 60% of the Port's container handling capacity.

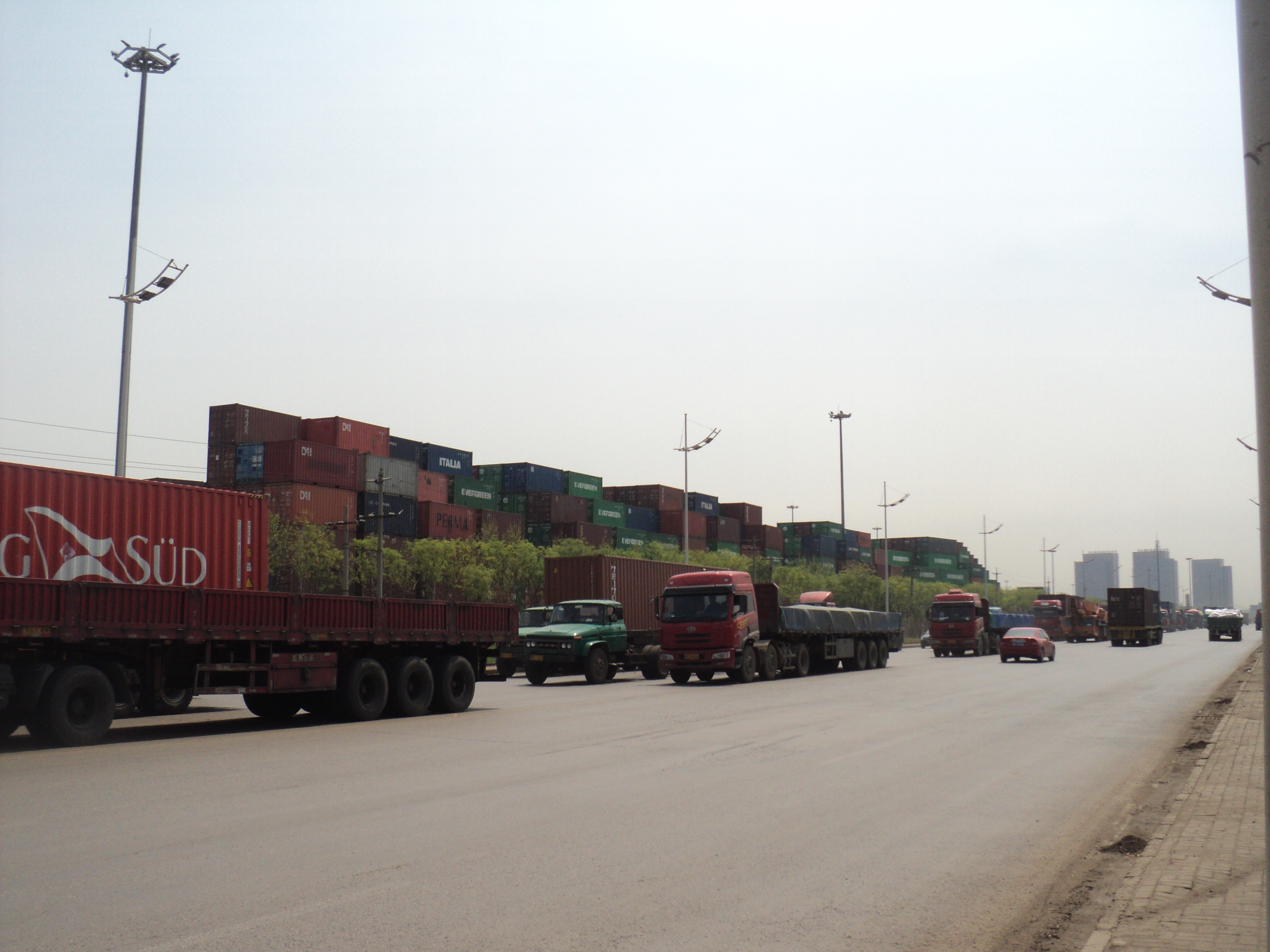
Heavy traffic at the Container Logistics Center

Tianjin Port International Logistics Development Co. Ltd. (TPL) was established in 2003 to take charge of the development, construction, operation and management of the center.

The Tianjin Port Bulk Logistics Center (天津港散货物流中心) opened on 2000, built on 26.8 km^{2} of former salt flats to the south of Donggu. It serves as a large storage and distribution area for coal, ore and other bulk cargoes. As of April 2011, there were 268 enterprises operating within it. The Bulk Logistics Center is being progressively relocated south, to the Nangang area, to free its land for urban development (i. e. the Binhai Central New Town – 滨海中部新城)

The 12-5 plan envisages six large logistics parks in the port area by 2015: the Container Logistics and Bulk Cargo Centers will be upgraded to "Parks" (with additional policy privileges), joined by the newly established Nangang Chemical Logistics Park (南港化工物流园区), Lingang Industrial ProLogis Logistics Park (临港工业普洛斯物流园区), and the Central Fishing Port Logistics Park (中心渔港物流园区).

Storage Yards and Warehouses
Yard name	Port area	Type	Total area	Warehouse area (number)	Container yard	Tank volume	Owner	Notes									
First Supply Distribution Yard (天津港物捷一堆场))	Beijiang	Bulk	12.6 ha	?	n/a	n/a	TPLD	Transshipment center									
Second Supply Distribution Yard (物捷二堆场))	Beijiang	General	14.8 ha	n/a	?	n/a	TPLD	Clearing and Intermodal									
Logistics Fourth Yard (物流四堆场)	TCLC	Container	25 ha	24000 m^{2}	?	n/a	TPLD	Notes									
Huahan Tianjin Container Yard (华韩天津货箱堆场)	Beijiang	Type	14 ha	3,300 m^{2} (1)	?	n/a	Owner	Notes									
Tianjin Gangshi Container Yard (天津港狮集装箱公司堆场)	Beijiang	Container	24,473 m^{2}	445 m^{2}(1)	n/a	n/a	Owner	Notes									
Sinochem Tianjin Binhai Logistics Yard (中化天津滨海物流)	Beijiang	Chemical	13 ha	28,500 m^{2} (16)	5 ha	2 ha		Sinochem	Notes								
Tianjin Zhouli Logistics Yard (天津洲丽物流堆场)	CLC	Container	8 ha	3000 m^{2}	?	?											
Zhongchu Freight Yard (中储股份货场)	Beijiang	Bulk	12.7 ha	8,000 m^{2} (1)	?	n/a	ZDH	Notes									
Zhongchu Container Yard (中储股份集装箱场)	Beijiang	Bulk	9 ha	10,338 m^{2} (2)	?	n/a	ZDH	Both Zhongchu yards are contiguous									
Sinotrans Storage and Distribution (中国外运天津储运公司)	Beijiang	General	6.77 ha	18,200 m^{2} (16)	n/a	n/a	Sinotrans	Notes									
Tianjin Haibin COSCO Container Logistics (天津滨海中远集装箱物流)	TCLC	Container	2 ha	12,000 m^{2} (2)	?	n/a	Cosco										
Huaxi Logistics Company Yard(天津港保税区华锡集装箱物流有限公司)	CLC	Container	10.6 ha	12,000 m2	?	n/a	Owner	Customs clearance									
Boda Logistics Yard (天津博达集团有限公司)	CLC	Container	10 ha	8,400 m^{2}	n/a	n/a	Owner	Notes									
Jinshi Minmetal Yard (金狮五矿物业有限公司)	CLC	Container	7 ha	5,000 m^{2} (3)	n/a	n/a	Minmetal	Notes									
Tianjin Gangqiang Logistics Yard (天津港强物流有限公司)	TCLC	Container & General	10 ha	16,000 m^{2}	?	n/a	Owner										
Xintonghai Yard(新通海堆场)	TJFTZ	Container	10 ha	2000 m2 (1)	?	n/a	TPLD; APL		Customs Clearance Yard								
CMIC Zhenhua Logistics Company Yard( 港中集振华物流有限公司)	CLC	Container	8 ha	6,000 m^{2}	?	n/a	CMIC. TPILD, ZLG	Notes									
Tianjin Kaitai Logistics Yard (天津开泰国际物流)	CLC	Container/Cars	7.73 ha	6,000 m^{2}	n/a	n/a	TPLD	Opened Nov 2011									
Tianjin Greater Asia International Logistics Company (天津大亚国际物流有限公司)	CLC	Container	16 ha Area	7,000 m2	8,000 TEU	n/a	Binhai Investment Group	Notes									
China Rail Materials Tianjin Oil Products Distribution (中铁物资天津油品供应有限公司)	Nanjiang	Oil	3.7 ha	n/a	n/a	50,000 m^{3} (6)	China Rail	Notes									
Tianjin Port Steel Logistics Yard(天津港钢材物流有限公司)	Port Area	Type	Yard Area	22 ha	Tank Volume	Railways	TPD; TPSS; TEDA; Fusheng Haiyun Group	Notes									
Tianjin Hongbao Company Yard (天津宏保物流有限公)	CLC	Container	6 ha	6,000 m^{2} (1)	?	n/a	?	Notes									
Keyun International Logistics Group Yard (克运国际物流集团)	CLC	Container	15 ha	15,000 m^{2}	15,000	n/a	Owner	Notes									
Minmetal Logistics Group (五矿物流集团有限公司)	CLC	Container	7.2 ha	6,000 m^{2}	500 full / 5,000 empty	n/a	Minmetal	Notes –	Tianjin Port Aviation Oil Petrochemical Storage Base (天津港航油石化储运基地油库)	Nanjiang	Oil	?	n/a	n/a	370,000 m^{3} (630000 m^{3} planned)	CAO; TPC	Under Construction
Hairun Logistics Park (海润物流园)	Dongjiang	Type	61 ha	(28)	(7)	n/a	Tianjin Port Dongjiang Construction Development Company	Notes									
Xinhe Oil Distribution Center (中国石化销售有限公司华北分公司天津储备库新河分库)	Haihe	Oil	?	n/a	TEU	80,000 m^{3}	Sinopec	Notes									
Sinochem International Dangerous Goods Logistics Center (中化国际公司危险品物流中心)	CLC	Container/General	10 ha	4	95,000 TEU/yr	?	Sinochem										

=== Intermodal Transportation and Dry Ports ===
Economic Hinterland: The hinterland of the Tianjin Port (as determined by existing railway and road patterns) is vast. It includes the municipalities of Beijing and Tianjin, and the provinces of Hebei, Henan, Shanxi, Shaanxi, Ningxia, Gansu, Qinghai, Tibet and Xinjiang, amounting to over 5 million km^{2}, or 52% of China's area, and covering 17% of the country's population. Tianjin is also one of the railheads of the Eurasian Land Bridge. (Note: Tianjin Port is often named in publicity material as the start of the Chinese branch of Eurasian Land Bridge. Officially, however, the port of Lianyungang is the Bridge's start. Tianjin is indeed the proposed railhead of the UNESCAP Intermodal Transport Corridor 1 from Busan to Yekaterinburg via Irkutsk. "Archived copy" (PDF). Archived from the original (PDF) on 2009-12-22.)

In keeping with the goal of becoming North China's Trade and Logistic Center, the Port has been expanding its intermodal transport capacity, and deepening its presence in inland regions through dedicated container train lines, dry ports and direct partnerships.

Dedicated Container Train Routes: TPL owns and operates 15 different scheduled railway routes, dispatching 50-car (100 TEU) trains to 15 different cities in China, including Xi'an, Chengdu, Taiyuan, Ürümqi, Baotou, Shizuishan, Erenhot, Alashankou, and Manzhouli, the last three being border crossings. In the first half of 2011, these dedicated train lines carried 129,000 TEU, including cargoes for Eurasian destinations.

Dry Ports: As of October 2011, Tianjin Port had established 21 dry ports, of which 8 were fully operational. These ports are located at:

Map of the Port of Tianjin's National Network of Dry Ports and Intermodal Trains

1. Chaoyang (Beijing)
2. Pinggu (Beijing)
3. Baoding (Hebei)
4. Shijiazhuang (Hebei)
5. Zhangjiakou (Hebei)
6. Handan (Hebei)
7. Zibo (Shandong)
8. Dezhou (Shandong)
9. Zhengzhou (Henan)
10. Hebi (Henan)
11. Daqing (Heilongjiang)
12. Baotou (Inner Mongolia)
13. Bayannur (Inner Mongolia)
14. Erenhot (Inner Mongolia)
15. Houma (Shanxi)
16. Xi'an (Shaanxi)
17. Datong (Shaanxi)
18. Jiayuguan (Gansu)
19. Yinchuan (Ningxia)
20. Huinong (Ningxia)
21. Dulat (Xinjiang)

Erenhot and Dulat are border crossings. In 2010, the Tianjin dry ports processed 150,000 TEU worth of containers. The 12th five-year plan envisages increasing throughput by Tianjin's dry ports to up to 1 million TEU by 2015.

== Friendship ports ==
- Amsterdam, Netherlands
- Barcelona, Spain
- Incheon, South Korea
- Kobe, Japan
- Marseille, France
- Melbourne, Australia
- Montreal, Canada
- Philadelphia, United States
- Tacoma, United States
- Tokyo, Japan
- Trieste, Italy
- Zeebrugge, Belgium
