= Solvency =

Term in finance or business

Solvency, in finance or business, is the degree to which the current assets of an individual or entity exceed the current liabilities of that individual or entity. Solvency can also be described as the ability of a corporation to meet its long-term fixed expenses and to accomplish long-term expansion and growth. This is best measured using the net liquid balance (NLB) formula. In this formula, solvency is calculated by adding cash and cash equivalents to short-term investments, then subtracting notes payable. There exist cryptographic schemes for both proofs of liabilities and assets, especially in the blockchain space.

== Importance ==
A lender must assess a borrower’s solvency before granting credit. Loan conditions, including the interest rate, depend on the perceived risk. A highly solvent borrower usually receives better terms.

== Solvency of individuals ==
European Directive 2014/17/EU introduced a common framework for consumer and mortgage credit. Solvency assessment is now a clear legal requirement for lenders and intermediaries.

The analysis considers income, expenses, assets, and other financial factors. The independent valuation of the financed asset is also part of the process.

== Solvency of businesses ==
Solvency is often evaluated through the gross operating surplus shown in the income statement. This indicator, minus expected loan repayments, should remain well above zero. A high level increases the company’s ability to obtain favourable rates.

The financial leverage ratio is another common measure.

== Other borrowers and tools ==
For individuals, solvency models often use ratios and predictive scoring tools.

For businesses, lenders rely on financial statements and performance indicators.

== See also ==
- Accounting liquidity
- Debt ratio
- Going concern
- Insolvency
- Quick ratio
