= 1970s in Hong Kong =

Hong Kong in the 1970s underwent many changes that shaped its future, led for most of the decade by its longest-serving and reform-minded Governor, Murray MacLehose. Economically, it reinvented itself from a manufacturing base into a financial centre.

== Background ==
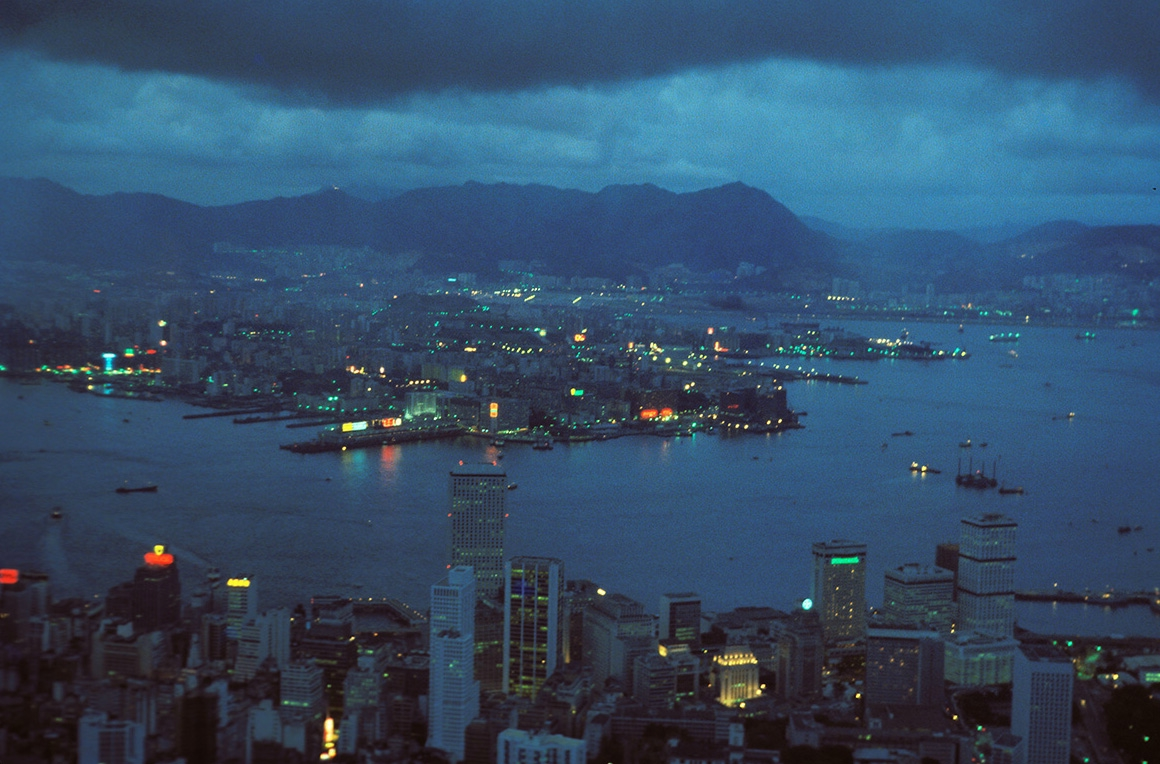
Hong Kong, 1970s

Political talks about the Second Convention of Peking resurfaced in the early 70s. The New Territories land lease agreement would end within 27 years in 1997. MacLehose began visiting Beijing to talk about the future of Hong Kong with PRC leaders.

The British and the PRC governments began a long negotiation process that would ultimately lead to the Handover of Hong Kong in 1997.

== Political and social development ==
Under Sir Murray MacLehose, 25th Governor of Hong Kong (1971–82), a series of reforms improved public services, the environment, housing, welfare, education and infrastructure. MacLehose was the longest-serving governor and, by the end of his tenure, had become one of the most popular and well-known figures in the Crown Colony. MacLehose laid the foundation for Hong Kong to establish itself as a global city in the 1980s and early 1990s.

A number of MacLehose's most significant policies included:

- Nine years of compulsory, free education for school-aged children
- ICAC (Independent Commission Against Corruption (Hong Kong)) in 1974: eradicated corruption in public bodies, police force, firefighters and business corporations, which led to Hong Kong being regarded as one of the least corrupt cities during the 1990s
- the Ten Years Housing Scheme, designed to end squatting and slums and provide ample housing for expansion.
- Social welfare protection: Jobseekers' Allowance, Elderly Allowance, Disability Allowance, etc.
- Overhaul of the healthcare system and construction of Queen Elizabeth Hospital, Queen Mary Hospital, Princess Margaret Hospital and Prince of Wales Hospital
- Adoption of Chinese, along with English, as an official language of British Hong Kong
- Development of new towns, Sha Tin and Tuen Mun
- Establishment of country parks to preserve 70% of Hong Kong's green landmass

With the rising public service provision came a clampdown on the free flow of refugees from mainland China that had powered the growth of Hong Kong since the Second World War. In 1974, the 'touch base' was introduced, under which only those immigrant arrivals who reached the urban areas were allowed to stay. Six years later, it was replaced by a policy of repatriation for all illegal arrivals.

== Culture ==
=== Metrication ===
The Metric System was adopted under the 1976 Metrication Ordinance. Subsequently, many of the wet markets and traditional Chinese medicine shops used the old Chinese system for at least another decade.

=== Education ===
The Hong Kong government introduced six years of free compulsory education in 1971, and expanded it to nine years in 1978. Companies were also seeking well educated employees for complex projects. Seventy-two percent of overseas graduates between 1962 and 1976 would come back to Hong Kong to take on highly skilled domestic positions.

=== Domestic entertainment ===
On 7 September 1975, Commercial Television was established. It provided competition for the other two other companies: Rediffusion Television and Television Broadcasts Limited. Unable to compete, Commercial TV closed down on 22 August 1978 after only three years of operation.

The 1970s was when Hong Kong gained daily news broadcasts. News programmes ranked in the top 10 continuously for a decade. Other segments of the ratings included TV dramas, which averaged 80 to 120 episodes, usually broadcasting at 7:00 pm. 66% of the population tuned in regularly covering 2 to 3 million viewers nightly. Popular series finales would empty streets and restaurants. Most series did not contain much if any Chinese traditionalism. The theme songs of these dramas also helped revive Cantonese music - indeed the term Cantopop was coined during this period.

=== Foreign entertainment ===
Hong Kong also found itself at a geographical and cultural crossroads. Many of the western artists like Elvis Presley and The Beatles were getting exposure in the music industry. Toys from Japan have arrived in Hong Kong via random and inconsistent shipments in the past. But the first big waves of Japanese products with staying power in the market place were mainly super robot toys. Gordian Warrior and Baxinger were some that were commonly available.

The 1975 Japanese series Ultraman was aired, and was named as such since the protagonist had eyes resembling eggs. The children were fascinated. Children tried to "fly" in the air, imitating their heroes. Two children (aged 3½ and 4½) attempted a flight jumping off a 7-storey building in Kowloon City on 26 July 1975. The younger brother was killed on the spot, while the elder was saved. The broadcast of the series was suspended for a while after the accident.

=== Cinema ===
The martial arts films starred by Bruce Lee, including the 1971 The Big Boss (唐山大兄) and Fist of Fury (精武門) the following year, were sensational. Cornered for some times by Western and Mandarin films, Cantonese films were much revived in the 1970s, with the great success of 1976 The Private Eyes (半斤八兩), directed by Michael Hui, which is said to remain the all-time box-office king of Hong Kong cinema when inflation is taken into account.

In 1973 the James Bond film The Man with the Golden Gun was filmed in Hong Kong. The film featured the wreck of SS Seawise University, formerly the famous Cunard ocean liner RMS Queen Elizabeth.

=== Natural disasters ===
In August 1971, Typhoon Rose passed over Hong Kong causing extensive damage, forcing the hoisting of Hurricane Signal No. 10 on 16 August. A total of 5,664 people from 1,032 families became homeless. The typhoon also destroyed 653 wooden huts and damaged 24 buildings, six beyond repair.

In June 1972, torrential rains caused two serious landslides in Sau Mau Ping and the Mid-levels respectively. Around 150 were killed and many buildings were destroyed.

In August 1979, Typhoon Hope reached Hong Kong but has weakened considerably from the 150 mph wind earlier.

=== Law and order ===
==== Anti-corruption campaigns ====
In the 1970s, corruption was a way of life in Hong Kong, being the norm in all government departments. Policemen would often extract bribes (popularly called "tea fee") before they investigated a crime, as did firemen before they rescued people and put out fires. Many Chinese detective superintendents amassed incredible wealth from their corrupt dealings with triads and corporations. Their names have been seared into the memories of the older generations, their stories adapted into several popular movies such as To be Number One (跛豪) in 1991. That is not to say British officers were entirely clean in their dealings.

In 1974, Hong Kong Governor Murray MacLehose, realising the seriousness of the problem, founded the Independent Commission Against Corruption (ICAC). The investigations and arrests of many police officers created a furore among the police, who protested against the ICAC and even tried to overrun the headquarters in one protest.

The Governor, concerned to avoid a possible police strike or even rebellion, at last issued a pardon, preventing arrests in cases committed before 1977. However, the pardon did not extend to higher-level detective superintendents. These high-level Chinese officers, famous for their riches, left for exile to Taiwan, which had no extradition treaty with Hong Kong. In time, the efforts of the ICAC changed the habits of an entire population and turned Hong Kong into one of the least corrupt cities in the world.

== Politics ==
=== Defend Diaoyutai Islands campaigns ===
In 1970, the American government returned to Japan the sovereignty of Ryukyu Islands and Diaoyutai Islands (known as the Senkaku Islands within Japan and the international community). The act stirred up Chinese nationalist campaigns which defended the People's Republic of China's rights to the Islands in Hong Kong. The "Hong Kong Federation of Students" (香港專上學生聯會) requested to protest at Victoria Park in Causeway Bay on 7 July 1971, but because of the riots four years prior, the police tried to reject the proposal. Nevertheless, the protest ended up happening and violence erupted, leading to the arrests of some of the students protesting. Pro-CCP media criticised the police intervention for its violation of the general will. The police officers involved were then returned to the UK. However, protests concerning Chinese sovereignty over the Diaoyutai Islands continued to be held the following months.

== Economy ==
=== Manufacturing ===
Many factors contributed to the decline of manufacturing in Hong Kong. The late 1970s saw increases in land prices. Along with the opening up of global trade with China via the 1978 reform and opening up, factories were gradually relocated to the mainland, where labour costs were lower.

At the same time, Singapore and Taiwan underwent similar developments to those of Hong Kong. The competitiveness of manufacturing similar products led to protectionism to shelter local companies. As a result, there was less demand for Hong Kong goods.

=== Property and land ===
Following decades of immense and sustained immigration, the shortage of housing in the territory became acute. Many lived in squatter settlements or boats, where they were susceptible to typhoons, fires and landslides. To improve the quality of public housing and relieve overcrowded conditions, the government announced the Ten-year Housing Programme (十年建屋計劃) in 1972, with the goal of providing quality housing for 1.8 million people in 10 years. The Hong Kong Housing Authority was formed to spearhead the programme. The government also introduced the Home Ownership Scheme (居者有其屋計劃) in 1976, building houses and selling them at below-market prices to help people own property.

=== Emerging businesses ===
Wellcome, the first supermarket in Hong Kong, was opened in Central in 1970. It was called "Gweilo market" by some locals, as most customers were westerners during the initial period of its operation, but Chinese citizens would soon embrace this new kind of store. By 1975, more than 200 big- and small-scaled supermarkets could be found in the city. These new stores eliminated most traditional rice dealers (米舖), wine shops (辦館) and convenient stores (See Dor) (士多). Wellcome and PARKnSHOP did not take long to capture the market. The front and full-page ads of these two mega franchises aided in their increase in popularity where smaller traditional stores couldn't. The first McDonald's restaurant opened on Paterson Street, Causeway Bay in 1975.

=== Infrastructure ===
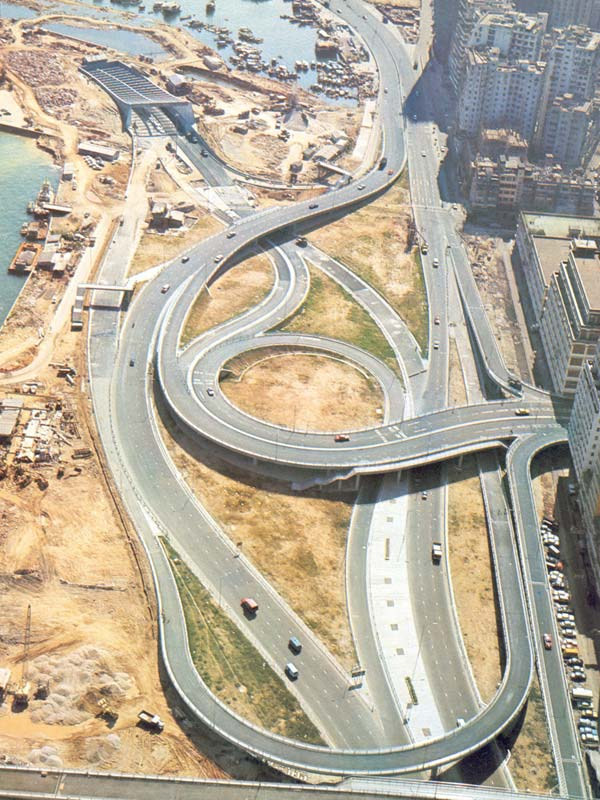
The area around the entrance of the Cross-Harbour Tunnel at the Island side in the 1970s, when the tunnel was being constructed.

Hong Kong's first modern rapid transit, the Mass Transit Railway (MTR) was opened in October 1979. The first line served eastern Kowloon from Shek Kip Mei to Kwun Tong. In December, services were extended to Tsim Sha Tsui, and by 1980, it was possible to ride from Kwun Tong to the central business district in Central on the other side of the harbour on Hong Kong Island.

The Cross-Harbour Tunnel, the first underwater tunnel in Hong Kong, opened in 1972. For the first time in the region's history, people could travel between Hong Kong and Kowloon without taking ferries. As a result, small electrical boats like sampans (小電船) were gradually eliminated.

Kai Tak Airport was expanded in the first half of the 1970s to handle Boeing 747s, despite the limited land space and proximity to nearby hills.

=== Finance ===
People grew richer entering the 1970s. Not surprisingly, people started to look for some means of investment. The passing of Banking Ordinance of 1964 would begin the tightening up of banks. A minimum capital of HK$5 million and liquidity ratio of 25% and limitation on loans and investments became the new requirements to operate legally. People began to have more trust in their banks, and the accumulation of savings led to people's willingness to invest.

Soon, the stock rush began. New stocks were on sale every day; brokerage houses mushroomed; some people quit their jobs to become full-time investors, suffering a kind of urban disease that doctors called "stock illness". It is said that the investors during this period numbered to 500,000. The Hang Seng Index kept soaring, but then crashed in March 1973, leaving many people bankrupt. The Hong Kong economy recovered only slowly over the next few years.

In 1976, a "Deposit-taking Companies Ordinance" was also passed to enforce non-licensed bank institutions to register with the government. A minimum paid up capital requirement of HK$2.5 million was also required. The strategy was to mirror the Deposit Trust concept in the United States.

=== Resource ===
As a result of the water shut-down by mainland China during the Cultural Revolution riots in Hong Kong, the government responded with a desalination plant at Lok On Pai, Castle Peak in 1975. The High Island Reservoir construction went from 1969 to 1979, and was expected to be the same size as Plover Cove. The construction, contracted by a Japanese company cost more than HK$400 million.

== Trivia ==
Tsang Tsou Choi, or the "Kowloon Emperor", began his career of calligraphy graffiti in the 1970s.
