= FitzPatrick 1932 =

1932 paper by Paul J. FitzPatrick

FitzPatrick 1932 is an early paper in the field of bankruptcy prediction. In a series of three articles in the monthly The Certified Public Accountant in 1932, Paul J. FitzPatrick presented data for 20 matched pairs of firms and discussed accounting ratios as indicators of bankruptcy. It is historically significant as an early attempt in this field, and it is notable also for its publishing a data set, now in the public domain. Beaver (1968), an important paper in accounting research which employs statistical analysis to a similar matched sample, cites the paper.

The dataset includes 13 accounting ratios calculated for 40 firms for each of three years. However some fields are missing for some firm-year observations.

== Example data ==
Pair I.D.	Survive?	Industry	Current ratio	Quick ratio	Net worth to fixed assets
1	0	Meat-packing	734	302	111
1	1	Meat-packing	426	221	121
2	0	Confections manufacture and sale	211	70	244
2	1	Confections manufacture and sale	629	312	298
3	0	Cereals manufacture and sale	85	42	47
3	1	Cereals manufacture and sale	493	261	177
4	0	Pianos manufacture and sale	203	91	287
4	1	Pianos manufacture and sale	793	544	621
5	0	Writing paper manuf and sale	468	197	187
5	1	Writing paper manuf and sale	286	144	178
6	0	Cane sugar and bananas prodn and sale	26	11	38
6	1	Cane sugar and bananas prodn and sale	139	133	110
7	0	Agriculture implement manufacturers	156	46	91
7	1	Agriculture implement manufacturers	325	126	225
8	0	Rubber footwear manufacture	287	196	210
8	1	Rubber footwear manufacture	223	132	260
9	0	Phonographs and records manufacture	138	54	114
9	1	Phonographs and records manufacture	414	226	261
10	0	Rubber tire industry	328	165	270
10	1	Rubber tire industry	347	160	258
11	0	Fish products production and sale	160	49	232
11	1	Fish products production and sale	135	47	100
12	0	Cotton textile industry of New England	282	66	124
12	1	Cotton textile industry of New England	392	133	134
13	0	Cotton textile industry of New England	99	71	75
13	1	Cotton textile industry of New England	160	65	142
14	0	Collars and shirts manufacture	2525	1275	118
14	1	Collars and shirts manufacture	2764	1541	591
15	0	Phonographs and records manufacture	274	153	304
15	1	Phonographs and records manufacture	555	351	345
16	0	Cotton textile industry of New England	51	22	78
16	1	Cotton textile industry of New England	171	49	129
17	0	Woolen textile industry	507	103	274
17	1	Woolen textile industry	226	55	261
18	0	Fertilizer manufacture	195	153	100
18	1	Fertilizer manufacture	761	573	125
19	0	Steel products manufacture	619	160	38
19	1	Steel products manufacture	584	216	144
20	0	Wholesale merchandise business	191	84	537
20	1	Wholesale merchandise business	170	109	635
