= Overtrading =

Term in financial analysis

Overtrading is a term in financial statement analysis. Overtrading often occurs when companies expand their own operations too quickly (aggressively). Overtraded companies enter a negative cycle, where an increase in interest expenses negatively impacts the net profit, which leads to lesser working capital, and that leads to increased borrowings, which in turn leads to interest expenses and the cycle continues. Overtraded companies eventually face liquidity problems and can run out of working capital.

== Conditions ==
- Rapid growth in business development and sales.
- Less net profit.
- The business running with limited knowledge.
- Cash flow problem or short of working capital.
- Inaccurate or unrealistic cash budget .
- Having many unpaid vendors.
- High level of interest / debt servicing costs.
- High gearing ratio.
- Keen market competition.
- Overstock or slow movement of inventory.
- Current and quick ratios fall.

== Alternative retail definition ==
In retail contexts, the term "overtrading" is sometimes used to describe a situation where a retail outlet has more customers than it can handle, or its sales per area are higher than comparator locations. This meaning of "overtrading" has been used in relation to Aldi and IKEA, especially in the UK.
