= Days payable outstanding =

Company efficiency measure for paying suppliers

Days payable outstanding (DPO) is an efficiency ratio that measures the average number of days a company takes to pay its suppliers.

The formula is

DPO = (ending AP)/(purchase per day),

where ending AP is the accounts payable balance at the end of the accounting period being considered and purchase per day is calculated by dividing the total cost of goods sold per year by 365 days.

DPO provides one measure of how long a business holds onto its cash.

DPO can also be used to compare one company's payment policies to another. Having fewer days of payables on the books than your competitors means they are getting better credit terms from their vendors than you are from yours. If a company is selling something to a customer, they can use that customer's DPO to judge when the customer will pay (and thus what payment terms to offer or expect).

Having a greater days payables outstanding may indicate the company's ability to delay payment and conserve cash. This could arise from better terms with vendors.

DPO is also a critical part of the "cash cycle", which measures DPO and the related days sales outstanding and days in inventory. When combined these three measurements tell us how long (in days) between a cash payment to a vendor into a cash receipt from a customer. This is useful because it indicates how much cash a business must have to sustain itself.

== Interpretation and limitations ==
Days payable outstanding is commonly interpreted together with the other components of the cash conversion cycle, namely days sales outstanding and days in inventory. A higher DPO means a company is taking longer, on average, to pay suppliers, which may improve short-term liquidity by allowing it to retain cash for longer. Within the cash conversion cycle, a higher DPO reduces the length of time that cash is tied up in operations.

However, DPO must be interpreted with caution. A high DPO may reflect strong bargaining power with suppliers, but it may also indicate payment delays or financial stress. In addition, DPO varies significantly across industries and countries, so comparisons are most meaningful when made between firms with similar business models and supplier relationships.

== See also ==
- Working capital analysis
- Days sales outstanding
- Days in inventory
- Cash conversion cycle
