= Trade working capital =

In business finance, trade working capital (TWC) is the difference between current assets and current liabilities related to the everyday operations of a company. TWC is usually expressed in percentage of sales.

== calculations ==
A typical way of calculating it is by subtracting accounts payable from the sum of accounts receivable and inventory.

== See also ==
- Cash conversion cycle
- Working capital
- Working capital management
