= Days in inventory =

Days in inventory (also known as "Inventory Days of Supply", "Days Inventory Outstanding" or the "Inventory Period") is an efficiency ratio which measures the average number of days a company holds its inventory before selling it. The ratio measures the number of days funds are tied up in inventory. Inventory levels (measured at cost) are divided by sales per day (also measured at cost rather than selling price.)

The formula for days in inventory is:

$DII = \dfrac{average~inventory}{COGS/Days}$, alternatively expressed as: $DII = \dfrac{Inventory}{Average~day's~COGS}$,

where DII is days in inventory and COGS is cost of goods sold. The average inventory is the average of inventory levels at the beginning and end of an accounting period, and COGS/day is calculated by dividing the total cost of goods sold per year by the number of days in the accounting period, generally 365 days.

This is equivalent to the 'average days to sell the inventory' which is calculated as:

$$\mbox{Average days to sell the inventory}=\frac{\mbox{365 days}}{\mbox{Inventory Turnover Ratio}}$$

== Interpretation and limitations ==
Days in inventory is commonly analyzed as part of the cash conversion cycle. A lower value generally indicates that inventory is being sold more quickly, while a higher value suggests that inventory remains on hand for a longer period and that cash is tied up in stock for more time.

However, days in inventory must be interpreted with caution. A high value may indicate weak demand, overstocking, or slow-moving inventory, but it may also reflect deliberate inventory policies, seasonality, or the business model of the firm. Comparisons are therefore most useful between companies in the same industry and over time for the same company, rather than across unrelated sectors.

== See also ==
- Inventory turnover, for a more complete discussion of issues related to the diagnosis of inventory effectiveness
- Working capital analysis
- Days sales outstanding
- Days payable outstanding
- Cash conversion cycle
