= TWC =

TWC may refer to:

== Organizations ==
- Taiwan Water Corporation, a water utility company in Taiwan
- Taylor Woodrow Construction, a British-based construction company, now part of Taylor Wimpey
- Tech Workers Coalition, an international labor rights group seeking to organize the tech industry
- Texas Workforce Commission, a governmental agency in the U.S.
- Time Warner Cable, an American cable telecommunications company that existed from 1992 until its 2016 purchase by Charter Communications
- Trans World Communications, the investment vehicle of businessman Owen Oyston
- The Weather Company (Australian company), now known as Weatherzone, an Australian meteorological service provider
- The Weinstein Company, an American film studio
- Trans World Connection, an American former airline, affiliate of Trans World Airlines (TWA)
- Tung Wah College, a private, self-financing college in King's Park, Kowloon, Hong Kong

== Technology ==
- Three-way catalyst, key component of catalytic converters
- Twincharger

== Media ==
- The Weather Channel, an American cable and satellite television network
- The Weather Channel (Australia), now Sky News Weather Channel, an Australian cable and satellite channel
- The Weather Cast, a short-lived television channel seen exclusively on Dish Network
- The Wordsworth Circle, an academic journal
- The Wrestling Channel, later The Fight Network, a defunct free-to-air digital satellite television sports channel in the United Kingdom and Ireland
- The Wacken Carnage, a live CD/DVD set by the death metal band Bloodbath released in 2008
- Age of Empires III: The WarChiefs, the first official expansion pack for the real-time strategy game Age of Empires III
- The White Council, in J. R. R. Tolkien's legendarium
- Transformative Works and Cultures, peer-reviewed open access academic journal

== Other uses ==
- Time Warner Center, a pair of skyscrapers in New York City
- Track warrant control, a traffic control method on secondary U.S. railroads
- Trade working capital, in business finance, the difference between current assets and current liabilities related to the everyday operations of a company
- Traditional Wing Chun Kung Fu, a style of the Chinese martial art
- Tumxuk Airport, IATA code TWC
