= Days sales outstanding =

Calculation to estimate accounts receivable

In accountancy, days sales outstanding (also called DSO and days receivables) is a calculation used by a company to estimate the size of their outstanding accounts receivable. It measures this size not in units of currency, but in average sales days.

Typically, days sales outstanding is calculated monthly. Generally speaking, higher DSO ratio can indicate a customer base with credit problems and/or a company that is deficient in its collections activity. A low ratio may indicate the firm's credit policy is too rigorous, which may be hampering sales.

Days sales outstanding is often misinterpreted as "the average number of days to fully collect payment after making a sale". The formula for this would be Σ((Sales date) - (Paid date))/( (Sale count)). This calculation is sometimes called "True DSO". Instead, days sales outstanding is better interpreted as the "days worth of (average) sales that you currently have outstanding". Accordingly, days sales outstanding can be expressed as the following financial ratio:

DSO ratio = accounts receivable / average sales per day, or
DSO ratio = accounts receivable / (annual sales / 365 days)

Accounts receivable refers to the outstanding balance of accounts receivable at a point in time here whereas average sales per day is the mean sales computed over some period of time. This can be annual as in the formula above, or it can be any period of time considered useful to the company. Because this is an average general KPI, though, choosing a time period that's too low may introduce undesirable artifacts in the data. Typically this is a calendar year or month or a fiscal year or period.

Changes in "the average number of days to fully collect payment after making a sale" could impact days sales outstanding in that fluctuations in the length of the average collection effort could affect a company's accounts receivable balance, but days sales outstanding is also affected by fluctuations in sales volume.

Days sales outstanding is considered an important tool in measuring liquidity. In some sense it measures the balance between a company's sales efforts and collection efforts. If sales decreases in isolation DSO will increase indicating that may run into cash flow problems in future when the sales dip flows through the collection cycle. If sales decreases proportionally to accounts receivable, DSO will not increase. While this may not be welcome news, it does not indicate a change in the balance of sales and receivables, and therefore will not affect DSO. Similarly, taking longer to collect will negatively affect DSO if sales remain the same (since the balance of receivables will increase), but if it's accompanied by a proportional increase in sales it does not change the balance of sales to receivables and so does not affect DSO.

Days sales outstanding tends to increase as a company becomes less risk averse. Higher days sales outstanding can also be an indication of inadequate analysis of applicants for open account credit terms. An increase in DSO can result in cash flow problems, and may result in a decision to increase the creditor company's bad debt reserve.

Days sales outstanding can vary from month to month, and over the course of a year with a company's seasonal business cycle. Of interest when analyzing the performance of a company is the trend in DSO. If DSO is getting longer, accounts receivable is increasing or average sales per day are decreasing. An increase in accounts receivable could indicate that customers are taking longer to pay their bills, which may be a warning that customers are dissatisfied with the company's product or service, or that sales are being made to customers that are less credit-worthy, or that salespeople have to offer longer payment terms in order to generate sales. Similarly, a decrease in average sales per day could indicate the need for more sales staff or better utilization.

Assessing DSO needs to take into account the industry the company is in, as the definition of a "good" DSO will depend on the business model. For instance fast payment is more the norm in the fuel industry, while relatively long payment terms are frequent in the financial industry. Also a small business will require a lower DSO, because it needs more liquidity, than a bigger business.

Some companies may attempt to focus in more on the collection aspect of DSO equation by calculating days delinquent sales outstanding (DDSO). This is simply ((delinquent accounts receivable))/( (average sales per day)). Because accounts receivable = current + delinquent accounts receivable, the DDSO formula is often defined as ((accounts receivable))/( (average sales per day)) − ((current accounts receivable))/( (average sales per day)). While mathematically more complex, it is the same number. This formula can be interpreted as DSO - "Best Possible" DSO, though. In this case it's the "Best Possible" because it's not assumed that, on average, you can expect your invoices to be paid before the due date. In this interpretation DDSO can be interpreted as the portion of DSO owing to over due receivables. Similar to DSO, though, DDSO can be affected by the speed of collecting overdue invoices but it does not measure speed. It measures size in units of average daily sales.

== See also ==
- Working capital analysis
- Days payable outstanding
- Days in inventory
- Cash conversion cycle
