= Exchange Bank Association =

Exchange Bank Association was originally established in 1897 in Hong Kong as a bank association in dealing with the foreign exchange business.

Afterwards, it became an organization that set interest rates on bank deposits to keep bank competition alive and balanced.

== History ==
The association was crucial in the stabilizing of financial markets during the colonial Hong Kong era from the 1890s to 1930s. Their interest rates however, only affected banks.

The 1960s and 70s would spawn new deposit-taking companies that set their own interest rates. This is one of the reason why the economy was split into a 3-tier system by 1981.

== See also ==
- Banking Ordinance
- Faster Payment System (Hong Kong)
- Hong Kong Association of Banks
