= Banking Ordinance =

Legislation of Hong Kong

Legislative Council of Hong Kong
- Long title: An Ordinance to regulate banking business and the business of taking deposits; to make provision for the supervision of authorized institutions so as to provide a measure of protection to depositors; to promote the general stability and effective working of the banking system; to make provision for the supervision of money brokers; and to provide for matters incidental thereto or connected therewith.
- Citation: Cap. 155
- Passed by: Legislative Council of Hong Kong
- Passed: 7 March 1986
- Commenced: 30 May 1986

Legislative history
- Introduced by: Financial Secretary Sir John Henry Bremridge
- First reading: 19 March 1986
- Second reading: 28 May 1986
- Third reading: 28 May 1986

Amended by
- 1986, 1987, 1988, 1989, 1990, 1991, 1992, 1993, 1994, 1995, 1996, 1997, 1998, 2000, 2001, 2002, 2003, 2004, 2005, 2005, 2011, 2012, 2013, 2014, 2015, 2016, 2017, 2018
- Status: Current legislation

The Banking Ordinance is a set of laws passed by the Legislative Council of Hong Kong to tighten restrictions for opening up or licensing a bank. Prior to the 1964 re-regulations, the government had no way to control bank's monetary effect on the economy. It also had no way of protecting the people utilizing the institutions. Banking was considered a Laissez-faire network, and was also described as "Free Banking" or "Wildcat Banking" filled with much uncertainty.

== History ==
=== Banking Ordinance of 1948 ===
The first law passed. It provided for the licensing of banks, examination of bank books, publication of bank statements and the appointment of an advisory committee. A Hong Kong dollar $5,000 license fee was required one-time. Afterwards, a bank could theoretically open on zero capital.

=== Banking Ordinance of 1964 ===
The law was passed on 16 October 1964 and advised by a group of senior officials from the Bank of England. A minimum capital of HKD $5 million and liquidity ratio of 25% and limitation on loans and investments became the new requirements to open a legit institution.

=== Banking Ordinance of 1967 ===
The law was passed in response to a banking crisis in which a few banks experienced liquidity problems and 18 acquisitions by larger banks were recorded. The revised law set the new minimum capital to HKD $10 million. A debt moratorium was imposed on new bank licenses.

== Hong Kong Association of Banks ==
The Hong Kong Association of Banks was established in 1981 as a network tag for banks that follow the ordinance rules.

=== Banking Ordinance of 1986 ===
The law is an enhancement to the existing 1967 set. Changes were made to the provisioning of banks, adequacy of capital, control of the management of a bank. It also merged the "Deposit-taking Companies Ordinance" which also required a certain capital before banks can accept deposits.

== See also ==
- Exchange Bank Association
