= Hong Kong Association of Banks =

Organization of Hong Kong

The Hong Kong Association of Banks (HKAB; Chinese: 香港銀行公會) is an association created based on a series of Bank Ordinances enacted since 1948. In 1981 the association was established and replaced the Exchange Bank Association. The ordinance provides a framework for the Hong Kong Government to exchange views with the banking sector for the further development of the industry.

Although banking licenses are granted by the Hong Kong Monetary Authority, licensed banks in Hong Kong are required to join the HKAB and are thus subject to HKAB's rules. Its members are the banks, not their employees. HKAB is under the auspices of its member banks, which are represented by their designated representatives in general meetings. Each member bank must designate a senior executive to represent it vis-à-vis HKAB at meetings.
