= Accounting liquidity =

Measure of a debtor's ability to pay their debts as/when they mature

In accounting, liquidity (or accounting liquidity) is a measure of the ability of a debtor to pay their debts as and when they fall due. It is usually expressed as a ratio or a percentage of current liabilities. Liquidity is the ability to pay short-term obligations.

== Calculating liquidity ==
For a corporation with a published balance sheet there are various ratios used to calculate a measure of liquidity. These include the following:

- The current ratio is the simplest measure and calculated by dividing the total current assets by the total current liabilities. A value of over 100% is normal in a non-banking corporation. However, some current assets are more difficult to sell at full value in a hurry.
- The quick ratio is calculated by deducting inventories and prepayments from current assets and then dividing by current liabilities, giving a measure of the ability to meet current liabilities from assets that can be readily sold. A better way for a trading corporation to meet liabilities is from cash flows, rather than through asset sales, so;
- The operating cash flow ratio can be calculated by dividing the operating cash flow by current liabilities. This indicates the ability to service current debt from current income, rather than through asset sales.
- The Crisis Liquidity Ratio (CLR), defined as (Current Assets – Receivables) / Current Liabilities, is used in crisis conditions to reflect situations where inventories may be more liquid than receivables. It was proposed by Bulgarian economist Petar P. Petrov and has been applied in liquidity studies of the Bulgarian automotive sector.

== Understanding the ratios ==
For different industries and differing legal systems the use of differing ratios and results would be appropriate. For instance, in a country with a legal system that gives a slow or uncertain result a higher level of liquidity would be appropriate to cover the uncertainty related to the valuation of assets. A manufacturer with stable cash flows may find a lower quick ratio more appropriate than an Internet-based start-up corporation.

== Liquidity in banking ==
Liquidity is a prime concern in a banking environment and a shortage of liquidity has often been a trigger for bank failures. Holding assets in a highly liquid form tends to reduce the income from that asset (cash, for example, is the most liquid asset of all but pays no interest) so banks will try to reduce liquid assets as far as possible. However, a bank without sufficient liquidity to meet the demands of their depositors risks experiencing a bank run. The result is that most banks now try to forecast their liquidity requirements and maintain emergency standby credit lines at other banks. Banking regulators also view liquidity as a major concern.

== See also ==
- Financial ratio
- Going concern
- Liquidity (disambiguation)
- Solvency
