= Top 500 Enterprises of China =

Ranking of the top enterprises in China

The Top 500 Enterprises of China is a ranking of the top enterprises in the People's Republic of China created by the Chinese Federation of Enterprises (CFE). The top-ranking company in 2005 was China Petrochemical Corporation, also known as Sinopec.

In 2006 the top 500 enterprises accounted for 78% of China's GDP. The top five were:

1. Sinopec
2. State Grid Corporation of China
3. China National Petroleum Corporation
4. Industrial and Commercial Bank of China
5. China Mobile

The top five in 2007 were:

1. Sinopec
2. China National Petroleum Corporation
3. State Grid Corporation of China
4. Industrial and Commercial Bank of China
5. China Mobile
