= Cash and cash equivalents =

Highly liquid, short-term assets

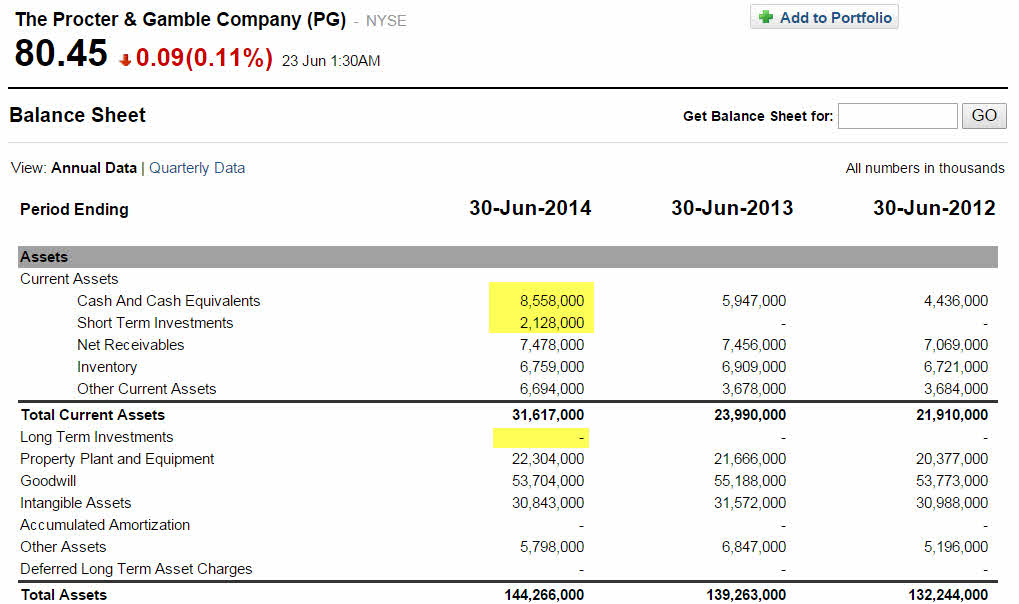
Cash and cash equivalents are recorded as current assets

Cash and cash equivalents (CCE) are the most liquid current assets found on a business's balance sheet. Cash equivalents are short-term commitments "with temporarily idle cash and easily convertible into a known cash amount". An investment normally counts as a cash equivalent when it has a short maturity period of 90 days or less, and can be included in the cash and cash equivalents balance from the date of acquisition when it carries an insignificant risk of changes in the asset value. If it has a maturity of more than 90 days, it is not considered a cash equivalent. Equity investments mostly are excluded from cash equivalents, unless they are essentially cash equivalents (e.g., preferred shares with a short maturity period and a specified recovery date).

One of the company's crucial health indicators is its ability to generate cash and cash equivalents. So, a company with relatively high net assets and significantly less cash and cash equivalents can mostly be considered an indication of non-liquidity. For investors and companies cash and cash equivalents are generally counted to be "low risk and low return" investments and sometimes analysts can estimate company's ability to pay its bills in a short period of time by comparing CCE and current liabilities. Nevertheless, this can happen only if there are receivables that can be converted into cash immediately.

However, companies with a big value of cash and cash equivalents are targets for takeovers (by other companies), since their excess cash helps buyers to finance their acquisition. High cash reserves can also indicate that the company is not effective at deploying its CCE resources, whereas for big companies it might be a sign of preparation for substantial purchases. The opportunity cost of saving up CCE is the return on equity that company could earn by investing in a new product or service or expansion of business.

== Components of cash ==
- Banknotes
- Coins
- Bank overdrafts normally are considered as financing activities. Nevertheless, where bank borrowings which are repayable on a demand form an integral part of company's cash management, bank overdrafts are considered to be a part of cash and cash equivalents.
- Cash in saving accounts is generally for the saving purposes so that they are not used for daily expenses.
- Cash in checking accounts allow to write checks and use electronic debit to access funds in the account.
- Money order is a financial instrument issued by government or financial institutions which is used by payee to receive cash on demand. The advantage of money orders over checks is that it is more trusted since it is always prepaid. They are acceptable for payment of personal or small business's debts and can be purchased for a small fee at many locations such as post office and grocery.
- Petty cash is a small amount of cash that is used for payment of insignificant expenses and the amount of it may vary depending on the organisation. For some entities $50 is adequate amount of cash, whereas for others the minimum sum should be $200. Petty cash funds must be safeguarded and recorded in order to avoid thefts. Often there is a custodian appointed who is responsible for the documentation of petty cash transactions.

== Components of cash equivalents ==
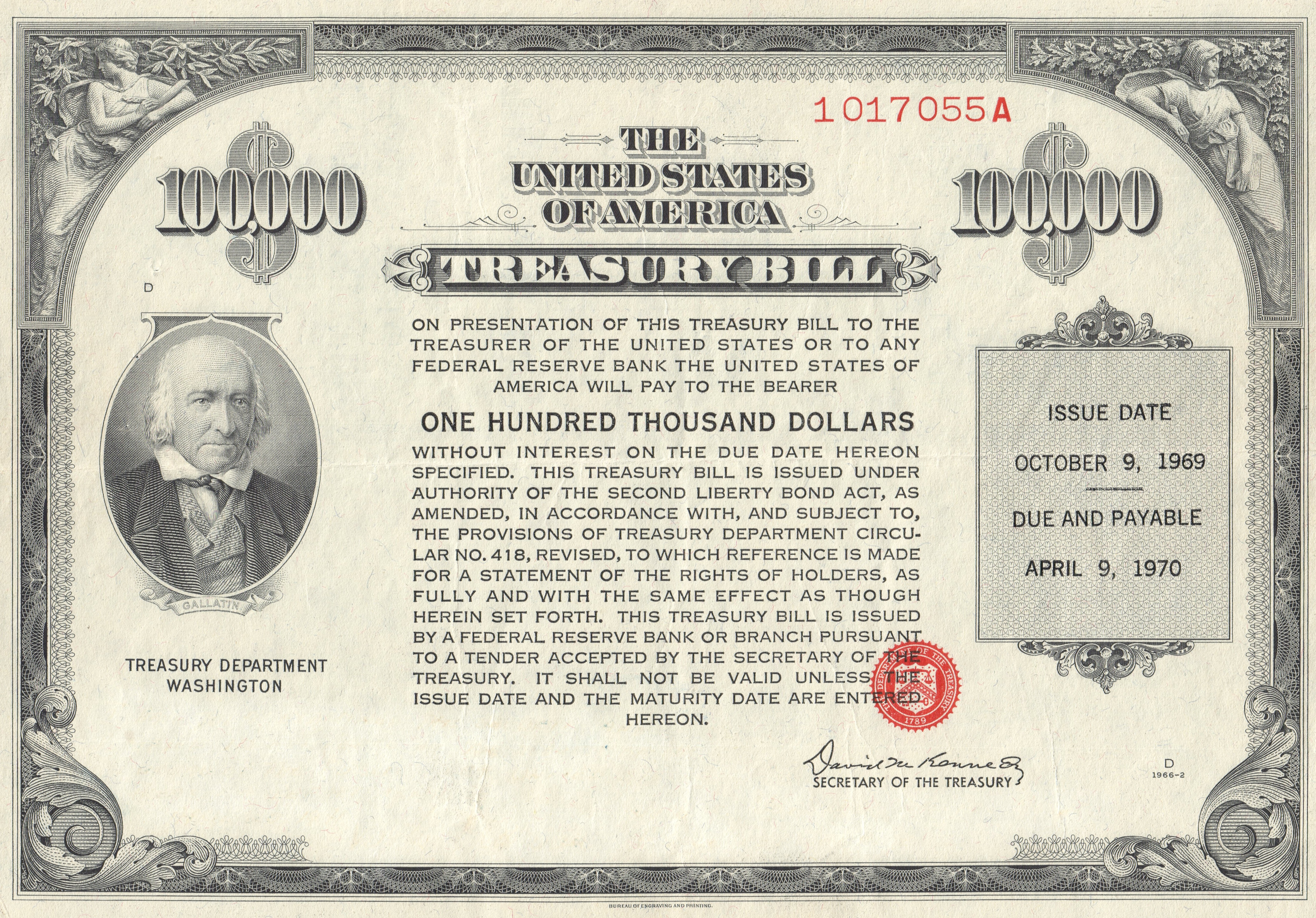
1969 $100,000 Treasury Bill

- Treasury bills, also called "T-bills", are a security issued by the U.S. Department of Treasury, where their purchase lends money to the U.S. government. T-bills are auctioned in denominations of $100, up to maximum amount of $5 million (or 35% of the auction offering if a competitive bid) and lack a coupon payment, but instead are sold at a discount, their yield being the difference between purchase price and redemption value, which is paid at maturity. Regular series Treasury bills mature in 4, 13, 26 & 52 weeks from their issue date, which may be purchased via TreasuryDirect or a licensed broker.
- Commercial paper is a bearer document which is used by big companies. The minimum amount permitted is £100,000 and this form of borrowing is not suitable for certain "entities". Finance companies sell 2/3 of their total commercial paper to the public, but there are also some companies which borrow less and sell their commercial paper to "paper dealers" who then re-sell the papers to the investors. A "round lot" for paper dealers is approximately £250,000.
- Marketable securities make business look more liquid, since they are also included in the calculation of current ratio. These securities are mostly traded on public exchange due to their ready price availability. There are two forms of Marketable Securities: Marketable Equity Securities and Marketable Debt Securities.
- Money market funds are similar to checking accounts, but they mostly pay higher interest rates generated on deposited funds. Net asset Value (NAV) of Money Market funds maintains stable compared to other mutual funds and its share price is constant: $1.00 per share. For businesses, non-profit organizations and many other institutions MMF are very effective "vehicle" for cash management.
- Short-term government bonds are mostly issued by governments to support government's spending. They are mostly issued in country's domestic currency and in the U.S. government bonds include the Savings bond, Treasury bond, Treasury Inflation-Protected Securities and many others. Before investing into government bond investors should take into account political risk, inflation and interest rate risk.

== Calculation of cash and cash equivalents ==
Cash and cash equivalents are listed on balance sheet as "current assets" and its value changes when different transactions are occurred. These changes are called "cash flows" and they are recorded on accounting ledger. For instance, if a company spends $300 on purchasing goods, this is recorded as $300 increase to its supplies and decrease in the value of CCE. These are few formulas that are used by analysts to calculate transactions related to cash and cash equivalents:

Change in CCE = End of Year Cash and Cash equivalents - Beginning of Year Cash and Cash Equivalents.

Value of Cash and Cash Equivalents at the end of period = Net Cash Flow + Value of CCE at the period of beginning

== Liquidity measurement ratios ==
- Current ratio is generally used to estimate company's liquidity by "deriving the proportion of current assets available to cover current liabilities". The main idea behind this concept is to decide whether current assets which also include cash and cash equivalents are available to pay off its short term liabilities (taxes, notes payable, etc.) The higher current ratio is, the better is for the organisation.
  $\mbox{Current Ratio} = {\mbox{Current Assets}\over \mbox{Current Liabilities}}$
- Quick ratio is a liquidity indicator that defines current ratio by measuring the most liquid current assets in the company that are available to cover liabilities. Unlike the current ratio, inventories and other assets that are difficult to convert into the cash are excluded from the calculation of quick ratio.
  $\mbox{Quick Ratio} = {{\mbox{Current Assets} - \mbox{Inventories}}\over \mbox{Current Liabilities}}$
- Cash ratio is more restrictive than above mentioned ratios because no other current assets than cash can be used to pay off current debt. Most of the creditors give importance to cash ratio of the company, since it give them idea whether the entity is able to maintain stable cash balances in order to pay off their current debts as they come due.
  $\mbox{Cash Ratio} = {\mbox{Cash and Cash Equivalent}\over \mbox{Current Liabilities}}$

== Restricted cash ==
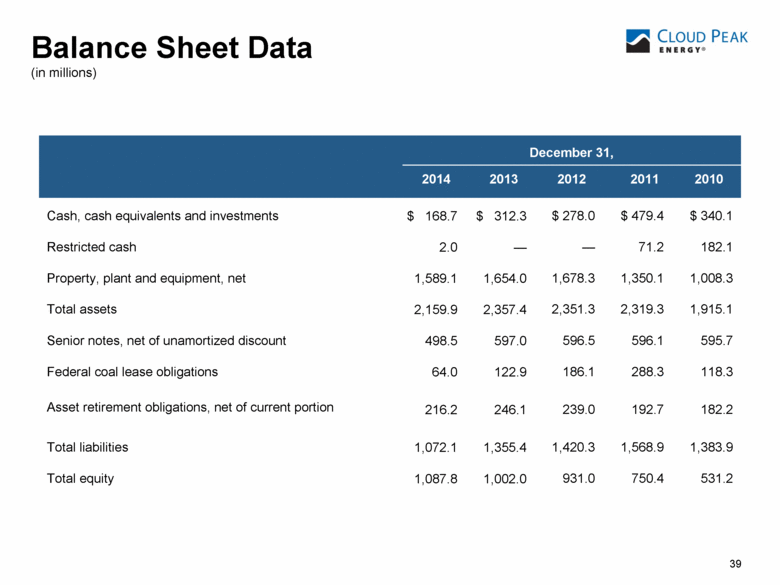
How restricted cash is presented in a balance sheet

Restricted cash is the amount of cash and cash equivalent items which are restricted for withdrawal and usage. The restrictions might include legally restricted deposits, which are held as compensating balances against short-term borrowings, contracts entered into with others or entity statements of intention with regard to specific deposits; nevertheless, time deposits and short-term certificates of deposit are excluded from legally restricted deposits. Restricted cash can be also set aside for other purposes such as expansion of the entity, dividend funds or "retirement of long-term debt". Depending on its immateriality or materiality, restricted cash may be recorded as "cash" in the financial statement or it might be classified based on the date of availability disbursements. Moreover, if cash is expected to be used within one year after the balance sheet date it can be classified as "current asset", but in a longer period of time it is mentioned as non- current asset. For example, a large machine manufacturing company receives an advance payment (deposit) from its customer for a machine that should be produced and shipped to another country within 2 months. Based on the customer contract the manufacturer should put the deposit into separate bank account and not withdraw or use the money until the equipment is shipped and delivered. This is a restricted cash, since manufacturer has the deposit, but he can not use it for operations until the equipment is shipped.

== See also ==
- Balance sheet
- Currency
- Inflation
- Inflation hedge
- United States Treasury security
