= Current ratio =

Liquidity ratio for a firm

The current ratio is a liquidity ratio that measures whether a firm has enough resources to meet its short-term obligations. It is the ratio of a firm's current assets to its current liabilities, (Current Assets)/(Current Liabilities).

The current ratio is an indication of a firm's accounting liquidity. Acceptable current ratios vary across industries. Generally, high current ratio are regarded as better than low current ratios, as an indication of whether a company can pay a creditor back. However, if a company's current ratio is too high, it may indicate that the company is not efficiently using its current assets.

A current ratio of less than 1 indicates that the company may have problems meeting its short-term obligations. However, if inventory turns into cash much more rapidly than the accounts payable become due, then the firm's current ratio can comfortably remain less than one. Low current ratios can also be justified for businesses that can collect cash from customers long before they need to pay their suppliers.

To determine liquidity, the quick ratio is also used, which excludes current assets that may not be easily liquidated, like prepaid expenses and inventory.

== See also ==
- Debt ratio
- Quick ratio
