= Current liability =

Liabilities of the business that are to be settled in cash

Current liabilities in accounting refer to the liabilities of a business that are expected to be settled in cash within one fiscal year or the firm's operating cycle, whichever is longer. These liabilities are typically settled using current assets or by incurring new current liabilities.

Key examples of current liabilities include accounts payable, which are generally due within 30 to 60 days, though in some cases payments may be delayed. Current liabilities also include the portion of long-term loans or other debt obligations that are due within the current fiscal year. The proper classification of liabilities is essential for providing accurate financial information to investors and stakeholders.

The classification of liabilities also plays a role in determining financial ratios, such as the current ratio—calculated as current assets divided by current liabilities. A higher current ratio indicates that the business has sufficient current assets to cover its obligations over the coming year, suggesting stronger liquidity. The difference between current assets and current liabilities is referred to as trade working capital.

== Classification ==
As provided by IAS 1, paragraph 69, a liability is classified as current if any of the following conditions are met:

- it is expected to be settled in the entity's normal operating cycle;
- it is held primarily by the entity for trading purposes;
- it is due for settlement within twelve months after the reporting period; or
- there is no right to defer settlement for at least twelve months after the reporting period.

Beginning on January 1, 2024, the International Accounting Standards Board amended IAS 1 with regards to the classification of certain liabilities as current or noncurrent in the presentation in financial statements. Previously, the IAS 1 required that, for a liability to be classified as current, it must not have an "unconditional right" to be deferred for at least 12 months after the reporting date. The board removed this requirement, instead, the right to postpone the settlement must have substance and should exist at the reporting date.

Trade payables and accruals for employee and operating costs are considered part of working capital in an entity’s normal operating cycle and are classified as current liabilities, even if they are settled more than twelve months after the reporting period. Specifically, these items are classified as current if due within one year or the duration of the operating cycle, whichever is longer. If the normal operating cycle is not clearly defined, it is assumed to last twelve months.

Additionally, other current liabilities not part of the normal operating cycle are also classified as current if they are due for settlement within twelve months after the reporting period or are held primarily for trading purposes. Examples of these other current liabilities include financial liabilities held for trading, bank overdrafts, dividends payable, income tax payable, other non-trade payables due within a year, and the current portion of non-current financial liabilities.

== Measurement ==
All liabilities are conceptually measured initially at present value and subsequently at amortized cost. The Financial Accounting Standards Board (FASB), for instance, declared that all liabilities will be measured at fair value instead of historical cost. However, in practice, current liabilities or short-term obligations are measured and reported at their face amount rather than being discounted. This is because the difference between the face amount and the present value is typically immaterial and can be disregarded.
