= Quick ratio =

A company's liquid assets divided by its current liabilities

In finance, the quick ratio, also known as the acid-test ratio, is a liquidity ratio that measures the ability of a company to use near-cash assets (or 'quick' assets) to extinguish or retire current liabilities immediately. It is the ratio between quick assets and current liabilities.

A normal liquid ratio is considered to be 1:1. A company with a quick ratio of less than 1 cannot currently fully pay back its current liabilities.

The quick ratio is similar to the current ratio, but it provides a more conservative assessment of the liquidity position of a firm as it excludes inventory, which it does not consider sufficiently liquid.

== Formula ==
$$\text{Quick Ratio} = \frac{\text{Quick Assets}}{\text{Current Liabilities}}$$

Where quick assets can be defined as follows:

$$\text{Quick Assets} = \text{Cash and Cash Equivalents} + \text{Marketable Securities} + \text{Accounts Receivable} = \text{Current Assets} - \text{Inventory} - \text{Prepaid Expenses}$$

Although the quick ratio is a test for the financial viability of a business, it does not give a complete picture of the business's health. For example, if a business has large amounts in accounts receivable due for payment after a long period, while also having larger accounts payable due for immediate payment, the quick ratio may look healthy when the business is actually about to run out of cash. In contrast, if a business has fast payment from customers, but long terms from suppliers, it may have a low quick ratio and yet be very healthy.

Generally, the acid test ratio should be 1:1 or higher for a healthy company. However, this varies widely by industry. In general, the higher the ratio, the greater the company's accounting liquidity.

== See also ==
- Current ratio
- Financial Accounting
