= Glossary of mergers, acquisitions, and takeovers =

The following is a glossary which defines terms used in mergers, acquisitions, and takeovers of companies, whether private or public.

Acquisition
When one company is taking over controlling interest in another company.
Amalgamation
When two or more separate companies join together to form one company so that their pooled resources generate greater common prosperity than if they remain separate.
Backward Integration
This is a process by which a company acquires another company that produces the raw material or the ancillaries which are used by the former. This type of takeover guarantees, to a certain extent, an uninterrupted supply of raw materials and components at fair prices.
Bear Hug
It is used in takeover situations. It is an indication to the board of a target company that an offer of takeover is under consideration. A strong bear hug is a formal notice to the target company of an intended takeover. A teddy bear hug is an indication from a target company that it will favorably consider a takeover, but at a higher price than offered.
Black Knight
An unwelcome takeover bidder.
Bootstrap acquisition
This term is used in connection with a friendly takeover. When threatened with a hostile takeover, the target company exchanges some of its assets for shares held by dissident shareholders. Later on, the target company sells itself to a friendly acquirer who gets 100% of the target company for less than what it would have paid otherwise. The target company has virtually helped finance part of the takeover.
Creeping Takeover
It is a slow interceptive acquisition of the controlling interest in a company by buying its shares in the stock market over a period of time.
Dawn Raid
A takeover attempt by an individual or a company in which instructions are given to buy all available shares of the target company at current market price as soon as stock exchange is opened for business on a particular date. With this base the bidder makes an attractive offer to the other shareholders in order to make a full takeover bid.
Forward Integration
It is a process by which a company acquires another company that make use of its products to manufacture finished goods. This type of acquisition can go up to the point of retail outlets.
Godfather Offer
A takeover offer so attractive that the target company can not refuse. Usually this type of takeovers result in a change of the management team. Shareholders too, sometimes have reasons to assume that the takeover will serve some ulterior motive of the predator (such as asset stripping, transfer of reserves) rather than uphold their interest. A godfather offer has none of these nasty implication.
Golden Parachute
An employment contract offered to company directors and senior management which guarantees to pay extensive benefits if the executives is made to leave the company. Such contracts are offered to make unfriendly takeovers expensive.
Greenmail
To buy a large number of shares of a company with either of the two motives; to sell them at a higher rate to a corporate raider, or to offer them to the company for a similar profit. An offer which the management will find hard to refuse as its sale to the raider will threaten its existence.
Grey Knight
A takeover bidder whose intentions are unclear. He is neither a welcome bidder known as the white knight nor clearly an unwelcome bidder, known as the black knight.
Hired Gun
An expert who is hired by a takeover target company to fight off a predator.
Hostile Takeover
Takeover of a company by an individual, a group or another company which is not welcomed or approved by the management of the target company or its corporate philosophy. Such a takeover is resisted by the target company, using many ploys like the golden parachute, poison pill, or shark repellent.
Killer bees
Law firms, public relations firms, and investment bankers employed by a target company to fend off unfriendly takeover.
Lobster Trap
The anti-takeover strategy that involves restrictions in the charter on the acquisition of voting stock by individuals with a large percentage of the convertible securities, named for the trap that is designed to hold large lobster, while permitting small ones to escape. In particular, stipulating that a convertible debenture holder can not convert his debentures into equity shares if he already holds, or going to hold as a result of the conversion, 10% or more of the company's equity shares.
Megabid
A very large takeover bid.
Merger
An amicable involvement of two or more companies to form one unit, and to increase overall efficiency. The shareholders of merged companies are offered equivalent holdings in the new company, and old employees are generally retained. Takeovers, which are quite another matter, generate a lot more heat. A horizontal merger combines direct competitors in the same products and markets, while a vertical merger combines suppliers and the company or customers and the company.
Pac-Man Defense
A strategy of survival in the takeover game, named after a popular game in the US in the early 1980s, in which a character which does not swallow its opponents is itself consumed. In a typical Pac-man defense a target company in the takeover bid will threaten to take over the acquirer and start buying its shares.
Parent Company
A company which owns or controls subsidiary companies by means of owning a majority of voting shares. A parent company usually has a business of its own.
Poison pill
Defence strategy adopted by the target company. The company makes the takeover less attractive by such means as issuing fresh preference shares with the provision that in the event of a takeover the preference shareholders can redeem their shares at a high premium, making the cost of takeover quite unattractive.
Predator
A person, a group, or a company seeking to take over another company, known as the target company.
Radar Alert
Close monitoring of the stock market activity in a company's shares by a shark watcher appointed by the company for that purpose. The watcher will keep stock of the buying/selling of the company's shares and determine if an accumulation is taking place. If such a thing begins to happen the company is immediately alerted so that it can take suitable defensive measures.
Raider
A takeover artist, who may be an individual or corporate body by buying a controlling interest of shares in a target company, runs it his way, by appointing a new management team, and formulates a new set of policies.
Reverse Takeover
In which, a small company takes over a large company or a private company takes over a public company.
Safe Harbor
A ploy to foil a takeover bid in which the target company goes out and buys a heavily regulated business so that acquisition of such a company becomes unattractive to the sharks.
Sandbagging
A defensive move in a takeover bid, in which the target company plays for time being, in the hope that a white knight will come to the rescue.
Scorched Earth Policy
A defensive move in a takeover bid, adopted by the target company. In order to make itself unattractive as a takeover target, the company borrows money at exorbitant rates of interest. This unwise act may prevent the takeover, but often ruins the company.
Sharks
Corporate raiders.
Shark Repellent
Any of the many measures taken by the target company to hold off hostile takeover bids:
- A provision that the bidder must offer the same price of shares to all shareholders, and not to just a group of those who support the takeover;
- A Golden Parachute contact with top executives which will make it expensive indeed to get rid of them;
- A provision that a more than simple majority of shareholders, say two-thirds of three-fourths, would be required to ratify a takeover vote;
- Merger with another company, which will make the original takeover proposal difficult.
Shark Watcher
A specialist firm which keeps a watch on takeover activities on behalf of its client. It does so by monitoring trading patterns of its client's shares and by trying to determine the identity of parties who are buying up its client's share. A shark watcher also solicits proxies from the shareholders on behalf of its clients.
Shell Company
A registered company which has no significant assets or activities, often floated to collect finances for future operations, or set up as a front to evade taxes.
Show-stopper
To start a litigation to thwart an attempt at takeover.
Sleeping Beauty
A company which has some very attractive features, such as huge cash reserves, undervalued assets and real estate; it can be a potential target for a takeover which has not yet been propositioned by a bidder.
Summer Soldiers
Directors and management staff or a company threatened with a hostile takeover who only put up a token fight before giving up.
Supermajority Amendment
A provision in the corporate charter to fend off hostile takeovers which requires a very large number of shareholders, between 67% and 90%, to approve major decisions of the company.
Takeover
A change in the control of a company, accompanied usually by a changed in the board of directors and senior management if the takeover is hostile. In a friendly takeover, the management doesn't usually change, and the takeover works to the benefit of the target company. In a hostile takeover there may be an attractive public offer for the shares, or unsolicited merger proposals for the management, accumulation of controlling shares through buying in the open market, or proxy fights. There are various methods of fighting off hostile takeover bids, with colorful names.
Tender Offer
In case of a clean takeover bid there may be a public offer to the stockholders of the target company to sell their shares at an attractive price to the company which intends to take over.
Toehold Purchase
To purchase just less than 5% shares of a company to get a toehold, so that one can buy more later and notify the authorities that one now holds more than 5% shares of the company.
White Knight
A term used in a hostile takeover context, when a company, which can not prevent a takeover looks for a friendly rescuer who might outbid the Black Knight and acquire the company on amicable terms.
White Squire
Not quite a white knight, but one who buys less than a controlling interest in the company, but enough shares to prevent a hostile takeover.
