= Killer bees (business) =

Killer bees are firms or individuals that are employed by a target company to fend off a takeover bid. These include investment bankers (primary), accountants, attorneys, tax specialists, etc. They aid by utilizing various anti-takeover strategies, thereby making the target company economically unattractive and acquisition more costly. Corporations defend against these strategies using so-called 'shark repellents.'

Examples of strategy implementation by third parties are poison pills, people pills, white knights, white squires, Pac-Man defense, lobster traps, sandbagging, whitemail, and greenmail.

== See also ==
- Economics
- Mergers and acquisitions
- Microeconomics
- Takeover
- Industrial organization
