= Management entrenchment =

Managers making themselves irreplaceable

Management entrenchment is a industry-sociological phenomenon wherein the subordinate management of a company, franchise, or branch binds the efficiency, function, and knowledge of their workplace with their own person, rendering them irreplaceable without incurring significant damage to the company as a whole. This phenomenon complicates the process by which a manager's superior can intervene with management, despite the presence or lack of protest.

Management is a type of labor with a special role of coordinating the activities of inputs and carrying out the contracts agreed among inputs, all of which can be characterized as "decision making". Managers usually face disciplinary forces by making themselves irreplaceable in a way that the company would lose without them. A manager has an incentive to invest the firm's resources in assets whose value is higher under him than under the best alternative manager, even when such investments are not value-maximizing.

== Managerial entrenchment theory ==
When managers hold little equity and shareholders are too dispersed to take action against non-value maximization behavior, insiders may deploy corporate actions to obtain personal benefits, such as shirking and perquisite consumption. When ownership and control is divided within a company, agency costs arise. However, agency costs decline if the ownership within the company increases as managers are responsible for a larger shares of these costs. On the other hand, giving ownership to a manager within a company may translate into greater voting power, which makes the manager's workplace more secure. Hence, they gain protection against takeover threats and the current managerial market.

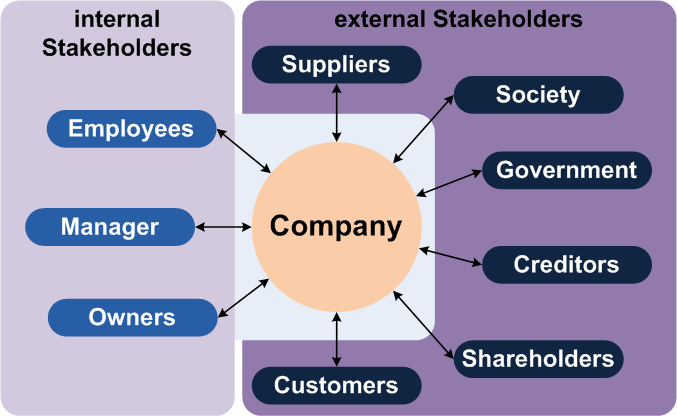
Types of stakeholders

=== Examples of entrenchment strategies ===
There are a variety of entrenchment practices that managers may employ, including the following:

- Poison pills, of which there are two types: a "flip-in" allows existing shareholders (except the acquirer) to buy more shares at a discount, whereas a "flip-over" allows stockholders to buy the acquirer's shares at a discounted price after the merger.
- Golden parachutes are contracts given to key executives and can be used as a type of anti-takeover measure taken by a firm to discourage an unwanted takeover attempt.
- Anti-takeover devices; companies have many different options for preventing takeovers. Continuous provisions include stipulations in the corporate covenant and issues of participating preferred stock. The sporadic measures include the Pac-Man and macaroni defenses, among others.
- A corporate amendment in a company's charter requiring a large majority (anywhere from 67 to 90%) of shareholders to approve important changes, such as a merger. This is sometimes called a "supermajority amendment". Often, a company's charter will simply call for a majority (more than 50%) to make these types of decisions.

== Managerial entrenchment and capital structure decision ==
=== Associations between the two ===
There are associations between managerial entrenchment and capital structure decisions which mostly result on the fact that CEOs are reluctant to go into debt when funding an investment. The capital structure is the way that the company chooses to fund its own operations and growth. Debt comes in the form of bond issues or long-term notes payable, while equity is classified as common stock, preferred stock or retained earnings.

Many models suggest that the manager keeps the leverage level according to where the firm mostly maximizes its value. The efficient choice of debt (optimal for shareholders) generally differs from the entrenchment choice (optimal for managers whose objective is to maximize tenure).

=== Research ===
Cross-sectional studies suggest that there is low leverage on firms where the CEO has characteristics associated with entrenchment. A characteristic would be if the CEO has years of experience in the same company. Low leverage was also persistent in companies which had no pressure or strong discipline over their CEOs. Events like the involuntary departure of the CEO and the arrival of a new large stockholder would gradually increase the levels of leverage comparing to before the events were to occur. Leverage also increases after CEOs are subjected to greater performance incentives in the form of increased inventories of stock options.

Moreover, during takeover threats, managers tend to increase debt in order to increase the firm's value, making it more difficult for the takeover to occur. However, this does not necessarily mean that the manager's job is secure. In a sample of target firms that levered up the most, 37 percent of the managers lost their jobs within a year of the failed takeover attempt.

=== Conclusions ===
According to the above research, there are three possible actions managers could take to entrench themselves in association with the gearing ratio:

- Managers are reluctant towards leverage as it concerns the firm's growth and activity. At the same time, they have the tendency to protect under-diversified human capital.
- Managers increase leverage above optimal point to increase their voting power of their stocks/shares with the aim of minimizing placement attempts.
- Managers sometimes allow excess leverage which is a temporary sign that assets are being sold and reorganized. This prevents attempts from outsiders as they might have different projects on how the company should grow.

== Managerial entrenchment and corporate governance ==
=== Corporate governance and firm value ===
Corporate governance essentially involves balancing the interests of the many stakeholders in a company; these include its shareholders, employees, management, customers, suppliers, financiers, government, and the community. A stronger corporate governance is associated with a higher firm valuation and corporate governance mechanisms can be classified into a number of categories such as regulatory mechanisms, disclosures, shareholder rights, ownership structures, and board monitoring.

However, through management entrenchment, ownership structure (one of the corporate governance mechanisms) changes in that way which benefits the managers. As discussed above, managers have a greater voting power while they are entrenched. A study carried out by Mock et al. on the relationship between manager ownership and firm's value found that as manager ownership increases, the firm's value increases as well–but not in the case where the manager is entrenched. The convergence-of-interest hypothesis suggests that a firm's market valuation should rise as its management owns an increasingly large portion of the firm. On the other hand, the entrenchment hypothesis suggests that as management increases its ownership, the incentive to maximize value declines as market discipline becomes less effective against a larger shareholding manager.

Hence the entrenchment effect will dominate the incentive effect only for medium concentrated levels of management ownership.

=== Corporate governance in credit unions ===
Credit unions have a different approach towards management entrenchment and corporate governance. Since credit unions lack principal-agent governance between shareholders and other members, managers already enjoy benefits and job entrenchments that are not based on their performance. Given the theoretical predictions of Fudenberg and Tirole (1995) and the empirical research by Kanagaretnam, Lobo and Mathieu (2003) we predict that credit union managers with higher comparative levels of salary and perquisites (and limited outside opportunities) will aggressively engage in accounting manipulations when job security is threatened.

=== Why managers engage in accounting manipulations ===
But to what extent are these managers willing to manipulate when capital requirements of credit unions are not met?

Triggering regulations to meet capital requirements for a credit union is very costly, but censuring accounting arbitrage is very costly at the same time. However, some argue the expected costs of regulatory violation are larger than the reputation costs of censure from capital management.

Therefore, managers have three good reasons to involve and censure their accounting manipulations:

1. Credit unions lack equity capital.
2. Lack of opportunities to increase raw capital because managers are unwilling to rise earning as in credit unions it is against their philosophical background (non-profit organisations)
3. Weak agency relationship between shareholders, members, boards etc.

Nowadays, there are several articles and essays on how to accomplish a proper entrenched management exercise without hurting shareholders, yet not abuse them–for example–when a board of directives is given the power to take corporate decisions in certain matters, where the corporation will be protected against hostile takeovers. Nonetheless, this form of corporate governance may cause distinct reaction on shares prices, which is why entrenchment management is not an easy concept to accomplish. Along with corporate governance, entrenchment management requires a lot of research and good management from the corporate market.

== Unions vs. entrenched managers ==
In practice, entrenched CEOs tend to have higher salaries than non-entrenched CEOs. A survey has been conducted which results suggest that entrenched CEO give higher salaries to their workers compared to non-entrenched CEOs. Because cash flow rights ownership by the CEO and better corporate governance are found to mitigate such behaviour, we interpret the higher pay as evidence of agency problems between shareholders and managers affecting workers' pay.

In a very real sense, unions and managers compete to offer benefits to employees. Since entrenched CEOs pay their workers high salaries, the CEO-worker relationship improves, making workers less likely to unionize. Often workers perceive managers' benefits to be more beneficial for them than unions. This leads us to the conclusion that entrenched CEOs have the characteristic of being very competitive when it comes to work loyalty.
