= Bankmail =

Bankmail is a tactic used in company mergers or acquisitions, specially in the case of a hostile takeover. It is an agreement between a company and a bank whereby the bank commits to providing financing for a specific takeover bid while agreeing not to finance competing bids from other potential acquirers.

== History ==
Bankmail became popular in the 1980s during the hostile takeover boom. Unlike takeover defenses such as poison pills or greenmail, bankmail operated through acquisition financing: a bank that supported one party to a transaction agreed not to finance a competing bidder.

== Notable cases ==
One of the most well-known examples is the 1989 attempted merger of Time Inc. and Warner Communications. Time allegedly paid a few banks not to help finance a hostile bid while also arranging emergency financing for itself.

In another attempted takeover of Unocal Corp.. by T. Boone Pickens' Mesa Petroleum, Unocal sued Security Pacific National Bank.

== See also ==
- Mergers and acquisitions
- Takeover
- Greenmail
- White knight (business)
- Breakup fee
