= Transformational acquisition =

Transformational acquisition is an acquisition of a company or a division of it with the aim to jointly establish a new business model or to enrich the offer for its customers by different expertise and new solutions. This may be different production technologies or new capacity.

This definition is used in recent years only, but a significant number of mergers & acquisitions allocate their transaction to this type.

== List of examples for Transformational Acquisitions ==
Year	Purchaser	Purchased	Transaction value
1999	Vodafone Airtouch PLC	Mannesmann	220 bill. US$
1996	Novartis	Ciba-Geigy and Sandoz	30 bill. US$
2014	MMG	Las Bambas	5.85 bill. US$
2015	Clinigen Group	IDIS Pharma	225 mill. £
2015	Electrovaya	Evonik Litarion	not published

== See also ==
- Mergers and acquisitions
- Takeover
- Management control
- Management due diligence
- Merger integration
- Successor company
