= Targeted repurchase =

Technique in which the target firm purchases back its own stock from an unfriendly bidder

A targeted repurchase is a technique used to thwart a hostile takeover in which the target firm purchases back its own stock from an unfriendly bidder, usually at a price well above market value.

== Empirical evidence ==
Mikkelson and Ruback analyzed 111 blockholder investment and targeted stock repurchases in 1991 findings. According to their analysis, stock prices rose significantly at the initial stage of block investment, but fell significantly at the time of repurchase; there were cumulative significant gains for the entire period.

== Examples ==
On August 20, 2002, KBF Pollution Management, INC., a recycling services provider, reported that it would repurchase stock from its current shareholders. KBF planned to fund its Share Repurchase Program through initiation of service for many new generators, some of which are Fortune 500 companies, and expectations of third quarter revenues exceeding second quarter revenues by 30%. Under KBF's Share Repurchase Plan, KBF stock can be purchased by block purchase from time to time as long as it is in compliance with SEC’s Rule 10b-18, subject to market conditions, meets legal requirements, and other factors. The repurchased shares are held in KBF's treasury where they are either inactive or applied to corporate use.

== See also ==
- Greenmail
- Economics
- Mergers and acquisitions
- Microeconomics
- Takeover
- Industrial organization
