= Pensions in Denmark =

Pensions in Denmark consist of both private and public pension programs, all managed by the Agency for the Modernisation of Public Administration under the Ministry of Finance. Denmark created a multipillar system, consisting of an unfunded social pension scheme, occupational pensions, and voluntary personal pension plans. Denmark's system is a close resemblance to that encouraged by the World Bank in 1994, emphasizing the international importance of establishing multifaceted pension systems based on public old-age benefit plans to cover the basic needs of the elderly. The Danish system employed a flat-rate benefit (social security benefit) funded by the government budget and available to all Danish residents. The employment-based contribution plans are negotiated between employers and employees at the individual firm or profession level, and cover individuals by labor market systems. These plans have emerged as a result of the centralized wage agreements and company policies guaranteeing minimum rates of interest. The last pillar of the Danish pension system is income derived from tax-subsidized personal pension plans, established with life insurance companies and banks. Personal pensions are inspired by tax considerations, desirable to people not covered by the occupational scheme.

Also included in the Danish pension system are statutory supplementary pensions. These cover a significant portion of the population, sometimes much more than just the workforce. Supplementary pensions are institutionally and by ways of funding similar to the occupational system.

== Historical Development ==
=== Early pension systems (1891-1960s) ===
Denmark introduced one of Europe's first formal pension systems with the Old Age Pensions Act of 1891, initially targeting low-income elderly. Following World War II, the Danish welfare state expanded significantly as part of the broader Nordic Model development. The state pension (Folkepension) was established in its modern form in 1956, providing universal coverage to all Danish residents.

=== Labour market pensions (ATP) - 1964 ===
A major institutional innovation occurred in 1964 with the introduction of the Arbejdsmarkedets Tillægspension (ATP - Labour Market Supplementary Pension). This system was created through a tripartite agreement between government, employers, and trade unions, reflecting Denmark's strong tradition of labor market corporatism. The ATP introduced a funded, mandatory occupational pension layer that complimented the pay-as-you-go public pension.

=== Occupational pension expansion (1970s-1990s) ===
From the 1970s onwards, Danish collective labor agreements increasingly included occupational pension provisions. By 1990, approximately 70% of the workforce had access to employer-provided pensions through collective agreements. These schemes gradually shifted from defined-benefit to defined-contribution models to reduce employer risk and enhance sustainability.

=== Major structural reforms (2000s) ===
Following the 2006 Welfare Agreement, Denmark undertook comprehensive pension reforms aimed at ensuring long-term fiscal sustainability as life expectancy increased. Key changes included the introduction of automatic indexation of the retirement age to life expectancy and gradual increases in contribution rates. These reforms positioned Denmark as a pioneer in adapting pension systems to demographic change.

=== Recent reforms (2010s-2020s) ===
From 2019 onwards, the retirement age (previously fixed at 67) became automatically indexed to life expectancy, with projections showing an increase to approximately 70 years by the 2030s. The 2022 "Ansvar for Danmark" (Responsibility for Denmark) agreement outlined further reforms to address labor shortages and ensure intergenerational fairness, including potential future increases in contribution rates.

== Public pensions ==
=== Universal social pensions ===
In Denmark, the public pension system is called the state pension. The pension consists of a basic income and a supplemental income. The basic income can be accessed at age 67 and the set amount is not determined by any hours a person may currently work. The supplemental income may be reduced based on net-earnings. As of 2025, the maximum monthly basic income for a single adult is DKK 7,198 (1,115.54 USD) and also DKK 7,198 (1,115.54 USD) per person for a married or a cohabitating couple. The monthly pension supplement maximum income for a single adult is DKK 8,329 (1290.85 USD) and DKK 4,262 (660.53 USD) per person for a married or cohabitating couple. The pension supplement is means tested. For single tax payers, the supplement will reduced for those with an income at or higher than DKK 95,800 (14,847.95 USD) and eliminated for those earning DKK 419,300 (64,986.90 USD) and above. For married or cohabitating partners who are both pensioners, the supplement will be reduced when making DKK 192,000 (29,756.97 USD) or more and eliminated completely when making DKK 511,700 (79,305.42 USD) or more. See below:

Component	Single Adult (DKK)	Single Adult (USD)	Married/Cohabitating (DKK)	Married/Cohabitating (USD)	Notes
Basic Pension (Folkepension – Basic Amount)	7198	1115.54	7198	1115.54	Universal base benefit
Supplemental Pension (Pension Supplement)	8329	1290.85	4262	660.53	Reduced with higher income

To receive this pension, recipients must have had lived in Denmark for 40 years while they were between the ages between 15 and 65. If a resident has spent less than 40 years in Denmark, then they can still receive the pension, just at a proportionately reduced rate. Funding for this pension is not based on contributions, rather funds are secured from general tax revenue collected by the state. The non-earnings based public basic pension is the reason for the very low, 8 percent gender pension gap for those ages 65 and up by income type in Denmark, compared to other Nordic Countries with income linked public pensions, with Finland at a 24 percent gender pension gap, Norway 23 percent, and Sweden at 28 percent.

The Social Disability Pension program is financed by general tax revenues dependent on social and medical factors and is historically known as a standard disability pension program. The SDP evaluates the medical and social criteria on three levels: the first granting eligibility to individuals younger than 60 with minimal work capacity; the next level is for people younger than 60 who have the work capacity equivalent to one third of normal, along with individuals between 60 and 66 years of age with hardly any ability to work; lastly, the ordinary SDP level is granted to individuals with the work capacity below half of normal, based upon social and/or health criteria. All pensioners receive a minimum of 40 percent of their average earnings, and receive additional support through easily accessible universal healthcare and housing benefits.

=== Occupational pensions ===
Occupational Pensions are another type of pension, covering nearly 90 percent of the Danish workforce. These schemes are mandated by collective bargaining agreements made between employers and employees, usually at the sectoral level. Company wide plans do exist, but they are not as common as sector wide pensions. Payouts made by these types of schemes are also determined by the contributions made by employees and employers. Typically, employee contributions range from 9 to 17 percent of their salary, with the average amount being 11 percent. Generally, high wage earners contribute a higher percentage of their income to their pension than low wager earners.

It is typical for the employer to contribute two thirds and the employee one third in the occupational pension system. Workers covered by different collective labor agreements are subject to mandatory participation, with varying contribution rates. Most plans depend on defined-contribution schemes, often including death and disability benefits. In 1998, the labor force was recorded to have contributed about 4% of their gross salary to pensions, and in 2002, 77% of the labor force contributed over 7%, exemplifying a steady growth in the average contribution rate. Depending on the plan, payouts can be collected in the form of phased withdrawals, lump sums, or life annuities.

== Personal and supplementary pensions ==
=== Personal pensions ===
Personal pensions cover additional private saving. Danish subsidized personal pension plans are extensive, often similar to occupational pension plans; however participation is voluntary and plans are financed by participants. Because contributions occur by means of collective labor agreements, they are classified as quasimandatory, as most workers are covered. These individual pension savings agreements between the individual and the institution stipulate the policy holder's entitlement to benefits after a specified age. Personal pensions are partial tax exemptions and have payouts similar to public pensions in that they can be collected by means of phased withdrawals, lump sums, or life annuities.

=== Labor Market Supplementary Pension Fund ===
The largest of the supplementary pension schemes is the Labor Market Supplementary Pension Fund, Arbejdsmarkedets Tillaegspension, or ATP. This pension's payout is determined by the contributions made by the individual. The more years a person works, and the longer retirement is delayed, the more money a retiree will receive. Contributions to ATP are mandatory for employees aged 16 to 65 who work more than 9 hours a week. Employers are also required to make payments. The required contributions are set by a fixed sum. As of 2014, for a full-time employee, the required payment was DKK 3240 a year. An employer is responsible for two-thirds of the payment while the employee makes the other third. If a person is less than a full-time employee, the contribution is reduced accordingly. Like the universal pension, the retirement age is 65. However, starting 2024, it will be increase by six months every year until it reaches 67.

=== Employees' Capital Pension Fund ===
Employees' Capital Pension Fund (in Danish, the Lønmodtagernes Dyrtidsfond or LD) was established in 1978 and was aimed at being an economic policy measure. When wages were adjusted upwards several times in the late 1970s, the Danish government decided only one price adjustment would be allowed annually, leaving the rest frozen and held in LD personal accounts until retirement. This attempt to contain inflationary practice led to the allowance of investing assets in mutual funds. In June 2005, the LD increased the total net asset under management in a month by investing all assets in mutual funds, a total of 12 percent.

=== Special Pension Savings ===
Introduced in 1998 as a fiscal policy tool to slow consumer spending while increasing pension saving by requiring all wage earners to contribute one percent of their gross salary, the Special Pension Savings program (SP) is Denmark's second largest supplementary pension scheme behind the ATP. Until suspension in 2003, SP benefits depended on investment returns and the size of the contribution. Suspension can be examined as a result of reduced incentives to engage, as households are not always fully rational, finding value in the optimization of employer contributions instead.

== Challenges ==
Pension policy in Denmark during the 1980s and 1990s was defined by pension funds and insurance companies guaranteeing a minimum interest rate for new pension policies. Compared to the high nominal rates that were common at the time, the guaranteed rates were low and were given to policyholders free of charge. Pension institutions invested in callable mortgage bonds that allowed borrowers to refinance their mortgages when interest rates fell, creating an asymmetric interest risk rate and encompassing a significant portion of the Danish financial system. When equity markets collapsed and the new millennium global interest rates diminished, pension contracts and institutions were subject to liabilities, drained capital reserves, and mismatched assets. This led to market-to-market valuation of the balance sheet and supervisory requirements to focus on the ability to withstand economic stress.

Pension systems in advanced capitalist economies are influenced significantly by labor market deregulation, unionization, deindustrialization, the rise of the service sector, and trends toward welfare state entrenchment. Denmark's deep integration in the world economy introduces risk as global financial conditions would impact household debt and consumption. Decommodification is influenced heavily by pensions because of the link created between retirement income and labor market attachment. Although the Nordic pension system combines generous social protections and labor market flexibility, polarization between workers and the unemployed widens inequality and in the case of occupational pensions, shifts risk to employees. To reduce labor supply of older workers while consequently lessening youth unemployment, early retirement would allow individuals who have paid contributions for up to thirty years go on early retirement at 60 until they qualify for old age pension at 65.

== See also ==
- Pan-European Pension
