= Nancy Reagan defense =

Tactic in corporate finance

The Nancy Reagan defense is a tactic in corporate finance used to counter a takeover or merger bidder who has made a formal bid to shareholders to buy their shares. When the board of directors of the target company meets to consider the bid, they "just say no."

For example, in a discussion of a takeover of the Walt Disney Company by Comcast, analyst Andy Kessler on Wall Street Week stated "there are two great Wall Street defenses. One is the Nancy Reagan defense and the other is the Pac-Man defense, right? And the Nancy Reagan defense is, just say no." An early use of the term referred to NCR's takeover defense against AT&T in 1991.

The term refers to the "Just Say No" anti-drug campaign of the early 1980s and repeated by former United States First Lady Nancy Reagan advocating abstinence from recreational drug use.
