= Flip-in =

Defence against corporate takeovers

In business, the flip-in is one of the five main types of poison pill defenses against corporate takeovers.

The flip-in is a provision in the target company's corporate charter or bylaws. The provision gives current shareholders of a targeted company, other than the hostile acquirer, rights to purchase additional stocks in the targeted company at a discount. These rights to purchase occur only before a potential takeover, and when the acquirer surpasses a certain threshold point of obtaining outstanding shares (usually 20–50%). If the potential acquirer triggers a poison pill by accumulating more than the threshold level of shares, it risks discriminatory dilution in the target company. The threshold level therefore effectively sets a ceiling on the amount of stock that any shareholder can accumulate before being required, for practical purposes, to launch a proxy contest.

In 2004, PeopleSoft was employing the flip-in model against Oracle Corporation's multi-billion hostile takeover bid. Andrew Bartels, a research analyst for Forrester Research said, "The poison pill is designed to make it more difficult for Oracle to take over the organization. The customer assurance program is designed to compensate customers should there be a takeover. It's a financial liability for Oracle." Oracle attempted to pursue court dissolution of this program, and in December 2004 succeeded with a final bid of approximately $10.3 billion.

== See also ==
- Mergers and acquisitions
- Takeover
- Flip-over
