= Control premium =

Amount that a buyer is sometimes willing to pay over the current market price

A control premium is an amount that a buyer is sometimes willing to pay over the current market price of a publicly traded company in order to acquire a controlling share in that company.

If the market perceives that a public company's profit and cash flow is not being maximized, capital structure is not optimal, or other factors that can be changed are impacting the company's share

== Overview of concept ==
Transactions involving small blocks of shares in public companies occur regularly and serve to establish the market price per share of company stock. Acquiring a controlling number of shares sometimes requires offering a premium over the current market price per share in order to induce existing shareholders to sell. It is made through a tender offer with specific terms, including the price. Higher control premiums are often associated with classified boards.

The amount of control is the acquirer's decision and is based on its belief that the target company's share price is not optimized. An acquirer would not be making a prudent investment decision if a tender offer made is higher than the future benefit of the acquisition.

== Control premium vs. minority discount ==
The control premium and the minority discount could be considered to be the same dollar amount. Stated as a percentage, this dollar amount would be higher as a percentage of the lower minority marketable value or, conversely, lower as a percentage of the higher control value.

$\mbox{Minority discount} = \mbox{1 – } \left({ {1 \over \mbox{1 + Control premium} }}\right)$

== Size of premium ==
In general, the maximum value that an acquirer firm would be willing to pay should equal the sum of the target firm's intrinsic value, synergies that the acquiring firm can expect to achieve between the two firms, and the opportunity cost of not acquiring the target firm (i.e. loss to the acquirer if a rival firm acquires the target firm instead). A premium paid, if any, will be specific to the acquirer and the target; actual premiums paid have varied widely. In business practice, control premiums may vary from 20% to 40%. Larger control premiums indicate a low minority shareholders' protection.

== Example ==
Company XYZ has an EBITDA of $1,500,000 and its shares are currently trading at an EV/EBITDA multiple of 5x. This results in a valuation of XYZ of $7,500,000 (=$1,500,000 * 5) on an EV basis. A potential buyer may believe that EBITDA can be improved to $2,000,000 by eliminating the CEO, who would become redundant after the transaction. Thus, the buyer could potentially value the target at $10,000,000 since the value expected to be achieved by replacing the CEO is the accretive $500,000 (=$2,000,000–$1,500,000) in EBITDA, which in turn translates to $2,500,000 (=$500,000 * 5 or =$10,000,000–$7,500,000) premium over the pre-transaction value of the target.

== See also ==
- Business valuation
- Divestment
- Equity value
- Enterprise value
- Goodwill (accounting)
- M&A
- Takeover
