= Serial acquirer =

Company that grows by repeated acquisitions

A serial acquirer is a company that pursues a strategy of growth mainly through repeated mergers and acquisitions rather than relying solely on organic growth. This approach is often associated with long-term "buy-and-build" or "roll-up" strategies, where numerous acquisitions are integrated into a larger operating platform.

== Characteristics ==
Serial acquirers typically share several features:

- A decentralized operating model allowing acquired firms to retain autonomy.
- Disciplined capital allocation, with acquisitions funded through reinvested cash flow.
- A focus on acquiring smaller companies in fragmented industries.

== Notable examples ==
Several publicly traded companies are frequently cited as examples of successful serial acquirers:

- Constellation Software
- Berkshire Hathaway
- Danaher Corporation
- TransDigm Group

== Criticism and risks ==
While serial acquisition strategies can generate significant growth, critics highlight risks including:

- Integration challenges across multiple acquired businesses
- Potential overpayment or misallocation of capital
- Reliance on favorable credit markets to finance acquisitions

== See also ==
- Merger
- Acquisition
- Rollup
- Private equity
- Conglomerate
