= Voting plan =

A voting plan or voting rights plan is one of five main types of poison pills that a target firm can issue against hostile takeover attempts. These plans are implemented when a company charters preferred stock with superior voting rights to common shareholders. If an unfriendly bidder acquired a substantial quantity of the target firm's voting common stock, it would not be able to exercise control over its purchase. For example, ASARCO established a voting plan in which 99% of the company's common stock would only harness 16.5% of the total voting power.

== See also ==
- Economics
- Industrial organization
- Mergers and acquisitions
- Microeconomics
