= Pension parachute =

A pension parachute is a form of poison pill that prevents the raiding firm of a hostile takeover from utilizing the pension assets to finance the acquisition. When the target firm is threatened by an acquirer, the pension plan assets are only available to benefit the pension plan participants.

In corporate governance, the pension parachute protects the surplus cash in the pension fund of the target from unfriendly acquirers; the funds remain the property of the plan's participants in the target company.

The law firm of Kelley Drye & Warren claims to be the pioneers of the "pension parachute". Their first pension parachute was implemented for Union Carbide, and its design was upheld in Union Carbide's litigation with GAF.

== See also ==
- Economics
- Mergers and Acquisitions
- Microeconomics
- Takeover
- Industrial organization
