= Institute for Mergers, Acquisitions and Alliances =

International professional association

- Abbreviation: IMAA
- Formation: 2004
- Headquarters: Zurich, Switzerland
- Official language: English, and various other languages
- President: Christopher Kummer
- Website: imaa-institute.org

The Institute for Mergers, Acquisitions and Alliances (IMAA) is an international professional association that is active in several countries. It was established in 2004 as a part of a fully accredited private university Webster University Vienna in Austria. IMAA is the most global professional body in the world in terms of membership diversity, international presence and activities. It aims to promote the creation, exchange and transfer of knowledge around mergers and acquisitions and strategic alliance. In 2007, the Institute was spun-off to continue its expansion as an Association headquartered in Zurich, Switzerland, but with branches in Vienna and Ho Chi Minh City. It remains affiliated with various universities and faculty members and acts as a non-profit think tank on M&A

== Education ==
The Institute has created a "body of knowledge for mergers and acquisitions" designed as a foundation for educational programs and curricula. Its International Mergers & Acquisitions (IM&A) designation is conferred upon members after completion of an education program designed for M&A professionals. IMAA is an active contributor to provide information on mergers and acquisitions in various industries and countries.

== History ==
The Institute was established in 2004 in Austria, and then changed to a Swiss Association in 2007. After having worked mostly in graduate studies and master's degree programs, its first executive education programs were taught in 2007. Various courses that had existed beforehand on strategy, the process of M&A, valuation, due diligence and post-merger integration were the foundation of the IM&A Certification.

== Accreditations ==
The IMAA is a non-degree granting institution. The Institute and their faculty members provide courses for triple-accredited business schools in several countries. Its materials are used by Harvard Business School, which included their materials in their "Essentials of Finance" series. In addition, the Institute partners on occasion with institutions like the CFA Institute.

== Research collaborations ==
The institute operates research projects and collaborations with consulting companies such as McKinsey & Company and Arthur D. Little, as well as with governmental agencies:

- the Bank of England
- Dubai Economic Council, advisor to Mohammed bin Rashid Al Maktoum
- the German Bundestag
- various institutions of the Government of United States of America
- various institutions of the Government of Vietnam
- UNCTAD of United Nations
- Asian Productivity Organization

== Membership ==
The IMAA offers memberships for both companies and individuals. Corporate members are supporting members that collaborate with faculty members on research. Individual Supporting Members of the Institute are known as IM&A Charterholders. Becoming a member requires passing the courses and examinations, two years of practical experience and meeting other requirements. Any person who is granted supporting membership of the Institute becomes an IM&A Charterholder and is entitled to use the letters IM&A after their name.

== Advisory board ==
The institute is advised by various members of its advisory boards that are organized in global advisory board meetings as well as national advisory boards in Austria, Switzerland, the United States and Vietnam.

== See also ==
- Mergers and acquisitions
- Strategic alliance
