= Gold brick (disambiguation) =

The term gold brick or goldbrick is dated American slang for a swindle selling a putative gold bar, by extension a swindle or swindler generally, more generally shrinking (slacking) or a shirker (slacker). It can also refer to:

- A gold bar
- Goldbricking, the avoidance of work or engaging in personal activities while at work
  - A US WWII army cartoon written by Dr. Seuss and directed by Frank Tashlin
