= Christopher Kummer =

German economist and professor of finance

Christopher Kummer (born 18 March 1975) is a German economist. He currently serves as a professor of finance at Hult International Business School.

== Life ==
Kummer was born on 18 March 1975 in Frankfurt. After graduating from Benedictine School in Engelberg, Switzerland in 1995 he completed his graduate studies in Strategy and Finance in 1999 at the University of St. Gallen with a dissertation supervised by Georg von Krogh. He received his PhD from Technische Universität Berlin in 2005 with a dissertation on mergers and acquisitions.

From 2004 to 2014 he was a professor at Webster University Vienna where he founded the Institute for Mergers, Acquisitions and Alliances (IMAA) and began a professional partnership with Michael E. Porter. As an advisor he led the HR Transaction Services unit from 2007 to 2009 at PricewaterhouseCoopers in Zürich, Switzerland. Since 2012 he is a professor of finance at Hult International Business School.

== Selected publications ==
- Mult-headquartered firms. A strategic analysis. 1999.
- International Mergers & Acquisitions Activity., 2005.

== See also ==
- Mergers and acquisitions
