= Sandbag (disambiguation) =

A sandbag is an obstruction device commonly used in flood control and temporary military fortifications.

Sandbag may also refer to:

- Bean bag, small pouch used in various activities
- Sandbag (Smash Bros.), a character from Super Smash Bros. Melee
- Sandbag (non-profit organisation), a campaign group for reduction of carbon emissions

== See also ==
- Sandbagging (disambiguation)
- Loaded sock
