= Sandbagging =

Sandbagging may refer to:

- Hiding the strength, skill or difficulty of something or someone in a sport or competition:
  - Sandbagging (chess), deliberately lowering one's rating to enter a lower-rated section of a tournament
  - Sandbagging (climbing), undergrading the difficulty of a climbing route
  - Sandbagging (cue sports), disguising one's playing ability
  - Sandbagging (golf), misrepresenting one's handicap
  - Sandbagging (grappling), competing in a skill-bracket or being ranked lower than one is deemed capable of
  - Slow play, deceptive play in poker
  - Sandbagging (racing), deliberately qualifying slower than what the car can actually perform
- Sandbagging (law), suing for a breach of a contractual representation or warranty despite having known at the time of the contract that it was untrue
- Sandbagging (professional wrestling), to not cooperate with a throw and to act as dead weight
- Sandbagging, a verb describing the use of sandbags for flood control and other applications

== See also ==
- The Sandbaggers, a British TV series from the late 1970s
- Sandbag (disambiguation)
