= Supermajority amendment =

Super-majority amendment is a defensive tactic requiring that a substantial majority, usually 67% and sometimes as much as 90%, of the voting interest of outstanding capital stock to approve a merger. This amendment makes a hostile takeover much more difficult to perform. In most existing cases, however, the supermajority provisions have a board-out clause that provides the board with the power to determine when and if the supermajority provisions will be in effect. Pure supermajority provisions would seriously limit management's flexibility in takeover negotiations.

== See also ==
- Mergers and acquisitions
- Supermajority
- Takeover
