= Post-merger integration =

Business rearrangement after a merger

Post-merger integration (PMI) is the process of combining and rearranging businesses to materialize potential efficiencies and synergies that usually motivate mergers and acquisitions. The PMI is a critical aspect of mergers; it involves combining the original logistical-socio-technical systems of the merging organizations into one newly combined system.

== Overview ==
The process of combining two or more organizations into a single organization involves several organizational systems, such as assets, people, resources, tasks, and the supporting information technology. The process of combining these systems is known as 'integration'. Integration Planning is one of the most challenging areas to address pre-close during a merger or acquisition. Even though culture clash between companies can cause integration problems, only 4% of the executives in a survey by Pritchett, LP reported that their organizations include culture-specific questions in their due diligence checklists. Culture-specific due diligence may include cultural screening and creating a cultural profile of the target firm. GE Capital conducts a cultural assessment of prospective candidates against metrics such as trust in existing managers, language barriers, and operating processes to then facilitate a culture work out session between both sides.

An example of a typical structure for an integration consists of three layers: a steering committee, an integration management office (led by an integration manager) and a variety of additional teams organized by function (i.e. sales, human resources, finance, and information technology, etc.) and/or by business unit, product line, process, or geographic location.

More communication to employees is usually necessary during post merger integrations than during day-to-day operations. Fortunately, many of the questions from employees can be anticipated.

Achieving successes early in an integration can help build confidence in a deal.

Common problems that may be encountered during post merger integrations include resistance to change, divided loyalties, issues with employee trust in leaders, blurred roles and responsibilities, unclear reporting relationships, communication tangles, job insecurity, unusual employee turnover, and infighting.

== Organizational lifecycle ==
Integration fits within an organizational lifecycle or specific business mergers and acquisitions cycle where businesses buy, integrate, then dispose of businesses:

- Definition of vision & strategy
- Selection of growth method: organic vs inorganic
- Target identification
- Pre-deal evaluation & due diligence
- Negotiation & deal completion
- Post-merger integration
- Acquisition integration
- Ongoing improvement
- Disposal

== See also ==
- Mergers and acquisitions
- Program management
- Project management
- Change management
- Corporate finance
- Management due diligence
