= Goldbricking =

Barely doing any work

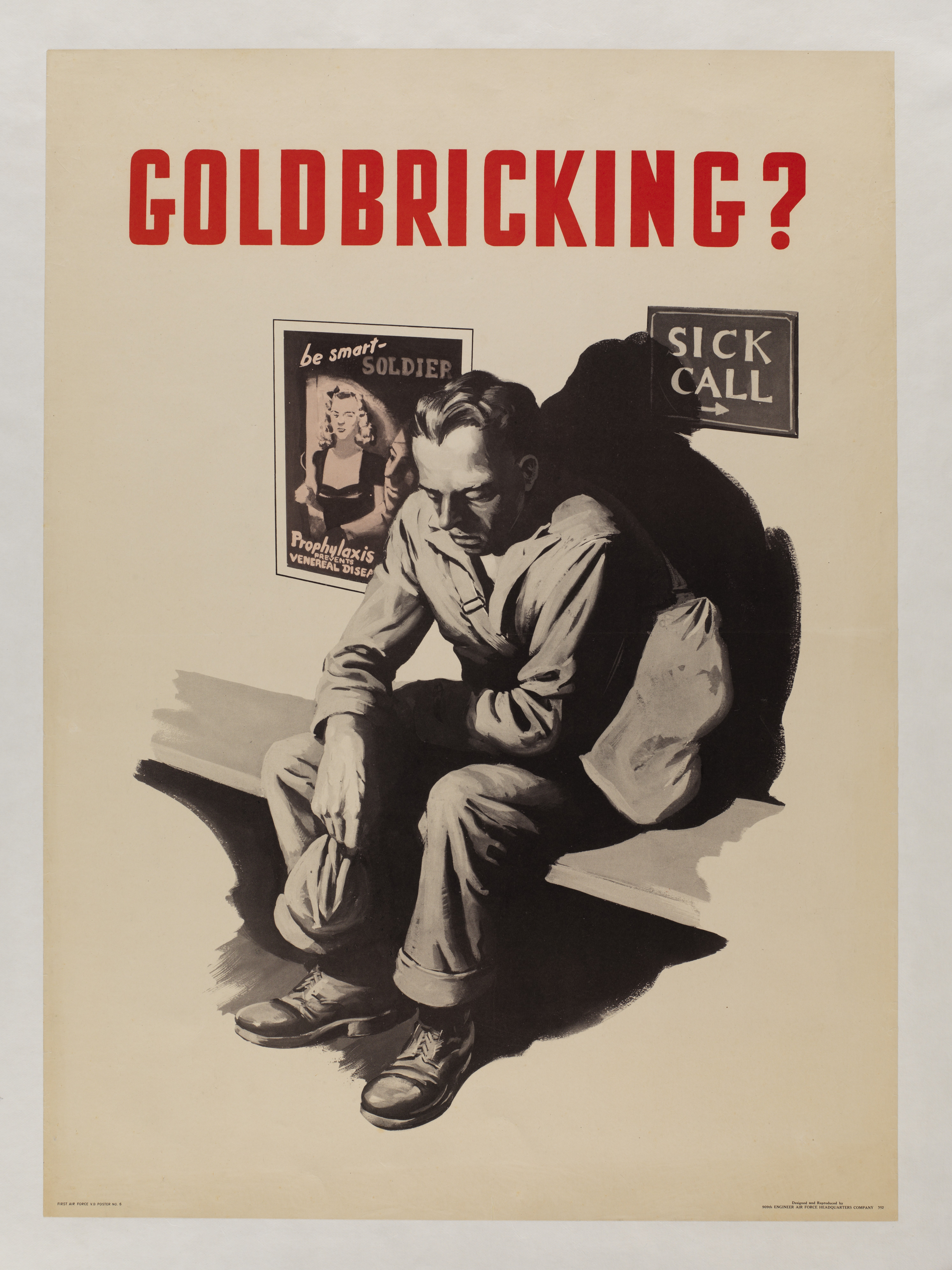
Anti-goldbricking poster from WW2

Goldbricking is the practice of doing less work than one is able to, while maintaining the appearance of working. The term originates from the confidence trick of applying a gold coating to a brick of worthless metal—while workers may appear industrious or productive on the surface, in reality they are less valuable.

A 1999 report estimated that in the United States, because human employees sometimes use internet access at work for non-work related activities, $1 billion a year of employers' computer-resource costs did not yield their desired profitability. Additionally, instances of goldbricking increased markedly when broadband Internet connections became commonplace in workplaces. Before that, the slow speed of dial-up connections meant that spending work-time browsing on the Internet was rarely worthwhile.

Many firms deploy surveillance software to track employees' Internet activity in an effort to limit liability and to improve productivity.

Goldbricking became a mainstream topic when Yahoo! announced in late February 2013 the banning of remote work: it had discovered that its remote workers were not logging into the corporate VPN often enough.

== Alternative views ==
Research has indicated that permitting employees to utilize computer resources for personal use actually increases productivity. Moreover, a study by the National University of Singapore entitled Cyberloafing at the workplace: gain or drain on work? concluded that using the internet for personal use served the same purpose as a coffee break and helped workers concentrate and stay engaged. Additionally, new research also shows that employees might use cyberloafing to cope with abusive and stressful conditions in the workplace when they perceive that they are being treated unfairly, disrespected, or given unreasonable deadlines.

== See also ==
- Counterproductive work behavior
- Internet addiction disorder
- Interruption science
- List of confidence tricks
- Sandbagging (disambiguation)
- Slacker
- Work aversion
- Quiet quitting
