= Managerial hubris =

Bidding Firms

Managerial hubris is the unrealistic belief held by managers in bidding firms that they can manage the assets of a target firm more efficiently than the target firm's current management.

Managerial hubris is one reason top managers, e.g., CEOs and board directors, may choose to invest in a merger that on average generates no profits.

== See also ==
- Leveraged buyout
