= Management due diligence =

Process of evaluating a company's senior management

Management due diligence is the process of appraising a company's senior management—evaluating each individual's effectiveness in contributing to the organization's strategic objectives.

Assessing company management as part of overall due diligence is crucial when closing business deals. It can mean the difference between long-term success or sudden failure. It also helps the organisation understand how the teams perform their roles in context with the company's future business plan. This helps clarify the structure of the organisation's work-force. The management due diligence process can be identified as an informative tool for external stakeholders, and can also be referred to as Management Assessment as it addresses the team’s dynamics and highlight the risks.

== Management assessment ==
Management assessment usually focuses on assessing the leadership skills and characteristics of the organisation's managers—such as the ability to adjust to a changing environment and communicate effectively with other individuals. These characteristics are key points in successful leaders.

A leader must consider all factors concerning a strategic decision, such as possible effects on employees and customers. Engaging employees and customers in the decision process helps build better relationships.

== Transactions that require management due diligence ==
Companies typically apply the due diligence process when they are about to engage in a major transaction with another company—such as selling or purchasing products or services, or buying (merging with or acquiring) the other company. Some transactions require a due diligence report that includes managements. Transactions that might require managerial assessments include:

=== Mergers, acquisitions and strategic alliances ===
Organizations considering a merger, acquisition or alliance should perform due diligence. This due diligence should investigate the other party's management team. Many mergers and acquisitions fail because of human resources and management-related issues, such as cultural clashes. These incidents occur because of different cultural values or different individual beliefs. To avoid such incidents, and cut costs on the long run, management teams must be assessed thoroughly.

=== Partnerships ===
Before organizations signs a partnership contract, they must investigate the other organization’s matters and affiliations, organizational structures, and behaviors. A management due diligence process achieves this.

=== Joint ventures and collaborations ===
When forming a relationship with another organizations, management due diligence helps an organization introduce management structure and the behavior of individuals.

=== Responsibility ===
Not only buyers carry out management due diligence, but also sellers of an organization. Usually, the process of selling an organization or adopting any external growth strategies requires the sharing of warranties. These warranties require private information from the organization—possibly including information and activities that they must shield from the view of third parties. In this case, the seller should carry out due diligence to ensure secure data.

== Importance ==
Management due diligence ensures sustainable profit and growth for organisations, as it identifies the human capital components. It ensures that highly skilled people are assigned the correct jobs and responsibilities. It increases the chance of a good return on investment by reducing risk.

Management due diligence identifies strengths and weaknesses of individuals in the management team and assesses their contributions to the organisation. It assesses management team members' abilities to reach common goals.

It identifies undiscovered dangers that eventually affect productivity. These might include unacknowledged motives or personal conflicts between individuals in management. It helps organizations efficiently appraise candidates for a management team position.

Management due diligence gives an organization a basis for expectations for team and individual performance. Accordingly, the organization can determine whether managers need training.

== Process ==
Since management due diligence lies in the financial analysis of a due diligence report, It shares the same process as creating a due diligence report with few variations.

=== Preparation ===
Preparation is key to an effective management due diligence process. In this phase, organizations gain sufficient knowledge about other organizations. This helps them decide on communication methods between them and other entities, in addition to putting resources in place to promote a successful process. After settling those issues, the organization must:

Form a team for the analysis process from skilled people with enough experience. After forming the team, the organization assigns responsibilities and settles on a process timeline. The organization may fill gaps in expertise by hiring or contracting external people.

Involve managers as early as possible as they must get to know the other organization's management team. Early introductions help managers deal with later obstacles.

Create checklists tailored to particular risks associated with the other organization.

Prepare a list of data requests for the information an organization needs to complete the process. Such data could include the business plan's management team section, or management organizational structure.

After negotiations, have both parties sign a confidentiality report to protect sensitive data from third parties. Agree on a method to store all confidential data—for example, an online data repository that both parties can view.

=== Execution ===
In this phase the organization begins analyzing gathered data. The team tries to confirm the target's representations and "soft" aspects of the target, such as its corporate culture. The team must make sure the other organization fits with its own after assessing their management quality. After gathering all the information, the team advises on whether their organization should continue to work with the other organization.

=== Closure ===
After the team finishes analyzing the management team, they submit a report to the final decision makers. If the team exposes irregularities or unexpected risks, the organization can bid on contract changes. If everything passes the assessment, team members switch to integration planning.

== Aspects ==
By performing management due diligence to assess the individuals working in an organization, different aspects must be appraised. The diagram outlines the main aspects that must be evaluated. The four circles in the middle represent the basic qualities that are considered essential for an individual assessment. The bigger circle "Role" represents the duties of the individuals in a certain organization. These duties usually vary from one individual to another depending on the job description of that individual. The biggest circle representing the employing organization is located in a market, making it easy to get affected by various external factors. These external factors are capable of hindering the organization from achieving its strategic goals and long-term objectives, making this a challenge that has to be dealt with.

For the individual assessment to be precise and accurate, it must be done after the organization's requirements have been highlighted and responsibilities of each individual are clear. Having such knowledge helps the business organization overcome future challenges and move closer to strategic objectives.

== Key points ==
Management due diligence needs:

- Defined objectives—set expectations in terms of management styles and qualities in individuals.
- Commitment—assess whether management resources can make the business succeed.
- Clear and role-specific division of duties—consider roles and duties of the leadership, which determines strong alignment with their position and role within the organization.
- External market factors analysis—careful considerations of factors outside of the company that may impact the organizations. These include changes, risks, challenges or opportunities connected with market, industry, government regulation, geography, sociopolitical situation, and more.

== Limitations and drawbacks ==
To assure reliable data, both investor and individuals under assessment must be involved in the feedback process. This can be costly and time-consuming to both parties. Since due diligence can be a detective game, organizations must find individuals who can detect small issues and opportunities. Organizations sometimes bring in outside experts.

The expense of the due diligence process, and the time involved, can be softened by dividing it into two stages. Executives may be so interested in a deal that they ignore identified risks and move ahead—and later suffer from management issues. Information gathering can involve interviewing the management team, but the team may see them as expensive and time-consuming. People doing the analysis might not be familiar with the organization's sector, which can lead to wrong conclusions.

== See also ==
- Executive education
- Managerial assessment of proficiency
- Managerial psychology
- Managerialism
