= Corporate synergy =

Financial benefit expected from corporate merger or acquisition

Corporate synergy is a financial benefit that a corporation expects to realize when it merges with or acquires another corporation. Corporate synergy occurs when corporations interact congruently with one another, creating additional value.

Synergies are divided into two groups: operational (revenue enhancement and cost reduction) and financial (decrease in cost of capital, tax benefits). Seeking for synergies is a nearly ubiquitous feature and motivation of corporate mergers and acquisitions and is an important negotiating point between the buyer and seller that impacts the final price both parties agree to; see Mergers and acquisitions § Business valuation. The synergy value should not be confused with the control premium; these metrics should be calculated separately.

Positive synergies arise when the combined corporation will bring about better results than the two independent corporations, as in the saying "the whole is better than the sum of the parts". If the corporations do not do due diligence, negative synergies may arise, in which the corporations would have been better off existing on their own.

== Cost ==
A cost synergy refers to the opportunity of a combined corporate entity to reduce, or eliminate expenses associated with running a business. Cost synergies are realized by eliminating positions that are viewed as duplicate within the merged entity. Examples include the headquarters of one of the predecessor companies, certain executives, the human resources department, or other employees of the predecessor companies. This is related to the economic concept of economies of scale. This leads to companies sometimes trying to reduce costs too much and make that their main goal after merging, which was found in the study from McKinsey. McKinsey is a global consultancy making revenues and therefore suffers due to neglecting day-to-day activities that will bring in revenue. For example when Kraft took over Cadbury, they tried to reduce costs by shutting down a factory that employed 400 staff. This led to greater problems as Cadbury's staff became uncertain about their job security which resulted in Cadbury's staff changing their attitude to work due to the fears that arose.

== Advantages ==
=== Managerial synergy ===
An increase in managerial effectiveness, which is required for the success of a corporation, will result in more innovative ideas that will improve the performance of the corporation as a whole. Synergies, therefore, result in more creative ideas and people are more likely to take risks due to the merging of ideas so there are more innovative solutions brought up compared to working alone Hunt, & Osborn, 1991). Synergy thus results in the strength of one corporation complementing the other. Thus, corporate synergies are able to overcome problems faced by independent firms and are able to reach positions that could take six years if these firms existed independently. Subsidiaries are offered the most advantages.

=== Tax advantages ===
The amount of tax a corporation pays is based on the amount of profit. So, they could merge with a corporation taking a loss in order to reduce their tax burden. However, this has been discouraged.

=== Increase in size ===
Corporate synergies due to mergers result in larger firm size which is perceived as more attractive to some investors as well as a larger firm gives a competitive advantage in an industry as higher market share allows firms to be more dominant and able control the market more.

== Disadvantages with corporate synergy ==
Managerial bias conflicts with the aims of synergies. This is because of the executives' view that the advantages that synergies bring along are their job, so their thinking is distorted rather than focusing on the most important aspects. This consists of:

=== Synergy ===
Managers consciously or unconsciously underestimate the costs of the synergy and overestimate the benefits so as to give themselves reason for the organization to go ahead with the synergy whether or not its benefits will outweigh the costs. Some executives base their achievement in an organization on this, and therefore make it their most important priority. A 2012 survey by Bain & Company found that overestimating synergies was the second biggest cause of post-deal disappointment.

=== Parenting bias ===
Managers compel the business units to cooperate in the synergy. It encourages executive managers to intervene greatly, which could lead to more harm than good.

=== Skills bias ===
Managers assume that the know-how that is required for the synergy is within the organization and a lot of the time, this is not the case. This bias comes hand in hand with parenting bias because if you intervene to make synergies occur than you going to assume that your corporation has the skills required thereby overlooking the skills gap. This then makes it difficult for a positive synergy to occur and might then make the joint corporation a waste of resources and cause resulting in a negative synergy.

=== Upside bias ===
Executives concentrating on the benefits of the synergy and ignore or overlook their potential drawbacks. “In large part, this upside bias is a natural accompaniment to the synergy bias: if parent managers are inclined to think the best of synergy, they will look for evidence that backs up their position while avoiding evidence to the contrary. “
