= Flipover =

A flip-over is one of five types of poison pills in which current shareholders of a targeted firm will have the option to purchase discounted company shares after the potential takeover. Introduced in late 1984 and adopted by many firms, the strategy gave a common stock dividend in the form of rights to acquire the firm's common stock or preferred stock under market value. Following a takeover, the rights would "flip over" and allow the current shareholder to purchase the unfriendly competitor's shares at a discount. If this tool is exercised, the number of shares held by the unfriendly competitors will realize dilution and price devaluation.

== See also ==
- Industrial organization
- Mergers and Acquisitions
- Takeover
