= Whitemail =

The word "whitemail", a coining by analogy with the term "blackmail", typically occurs in economics in the sense of a counter to a hostile merger, but also has meanings in marketing, fundraising, and bribery.

== Economics ==
In economics, whitemail is a counter to a takeover arrangement in which the target company will sell significantly discounted stock to a friendly third party. In return, the third party helps thwart takeover attempts by raising the acquisition price for the opposing bidder, diluting the opposing bidder's number of shares, and increasing the stock holdings of the company.

== Politics ==
Whitemail bribes are used to influence a high-level elected official or politician to perform an illegal or uneconomic act. This type of bribery is common in many developed and developing countries. It typically involves a large amount of money and is usually concealed through means such as fake accounting and documentation or moving the money through subsidiaries.

== Fundraising ==
In fundraising, whitemail is a donation received without a response form, coupon, statement, or other source identification, so it cannot be attributed to any particular fundraising campaign. These donations often come in generic, white-colored envelopes.

== Marketing ==
Whitemail refers to unsolicited mail sent to marketers from customers. It was also named for coming in generic white envelopes instead of official reply mail offered by companies.
