= Lobster trap (finance) =

A lobster trap, in corporate finance, is an anti-takeover strategy used by target firms. In a lobster trap, the target firm issues a charter that prevents individuals with more than 10% ownership of convertible securities (includes convertible bonds, convertible preferred stock, and warrants) from transferring these securities to voting stock. The term derives from the fact that lobster traps are designed to catch large lobsters but allow small lobsters to escape.

== See also ==
- Mergers and acquisitions
- Takeover
- Industrial organization
- Shareholder rights plan
