= Shareholders' protection =

Legal protection against the death of a shareholder

Shareholders' protection is a contingency process detailing what will happen to a shareholder's shares if the shareholder dies or becomes seriously ill.

In the interests of financial security, business stability, and continuity – particularly for private limited companies where there may only be a small number of principal shareholders – it is essential to provide a safety net following the loss of a shareholder:

- Shares may go to the deceased’s family, which has no interest in the business and would prefer a cash sum
- The company or other shareholders will want to retain control by buying lost shares – but may not have the resources to do so
- The shares may be taken over by someone who does not share the company’s objectives – and may even be a competitor
