= Sandbagging (law) =

Sandbagging, in the field of mergers and acquisitions law, refers to the act of claiming a breach of a contractual representation or warranty despite having known at the time of the contract that it was untrue.

== Legal status of sandbagging ==
=== United States ===
Delaware and New York law both generally permit sandbagging when a contract is silent on the point, whereas California law does not allow it unless the contract explicitly permits it. New York case law indicates that sandbagging is not allowed in cases where the information about the falsehood of the representation or warranty came directly from the seller.

=== United Kingdom ===
English law provides that "purchaser's knowledge" precludes post-closing remedies for breach of warranty, but that a contract may allow sandbagging based on pre-closing constructive knowledge or imputed knowledge (as opposed to actual knowledge).

=== Canada ===
Ontario case law has not dealt with default rules for sandbagging but has indicated that sandbagging may be permitted by contract. The civil code of Quebec imposes a requirement of good faith in the exercise of contractual rights which would likely preclude sandbagging.

=== Japan ===
The Japanese Civil Code does not allow sandbagging unless the contract explicitly permits it.
