= Breakup fee =

Penalty in a corporate takeover contract

A breakup fee (sometimes called a termination fee) is a penalty set in takeover agreements, to be paid if the target backs out of a deal (usually because it has decided instead to accept a more attractive offer). The breakup fee is ostensibly to compensate the original acquirer for the cost of the time and resources expended in negotiating the original agreement. A breakup fee also serves to inhibit competing bids, since such bids would have to cover the cost of the breakup fee as well.

== Reverse breakup fee ==
A reverse breakup fee is a penalty to be paid to the target company if the acquirer backs out of the deal, usually because it can’t obtain financing. Reasons for such fees include the possibility of lawsuits, disruption of business operations, and the loss of key personnel during the period when the company is "in play."

== Notable examples ==
- As a result of the failed 2011 merger of AT&T and T-Mobile, AT&T will have to pay a reverse breakup fee of $3 billion in cash and $1–3 billion in wireless spectrum.
- After Adobe abandoned its planned acquisition of Figma in 2023 due to antitrust concerns from regulatory authorities in the UK and EU, Adobe was required to pay Figma $1 billion in cash.
- If Japanese corporation SoftBank's $20 billion bid to buy 70% of Sprint Nextel had fallen through, SoftBank would have had to pay a $600 million reverse breakup fee. SoftBank completed the deal with Sprint and is no longer subject to the reverse termination fee.

== Sources ==
- Tarbert, Heath Price (Spring 2003). "Merger Breakup Fees: A Critical Challenge to Anglo-American Corporate Law". Law and Policy in International Business. Archived from the original on March 23, 2018 – via HighBeam Research.
