= Golden parachute =

Agreement providing compensation if someone is fired

A golden parachute is an agreement between a company and an employee (usually an upper executive) specifying that the employee will receive certain significant benefits if employment is terminated. These may include severance pay, cash bonuses, stock options, or other benefits. Most definitions specify the employment termination is as a result of a merger or takeover, also known as "change-in-control benefits", but more recently the term has been used to describe perceived excessive CEO (and other executive) severance packages unrelated to change in ownership (also known as a golden handshake).

== History ==
The first use of the term "golden parachute" is credited to a 1961 attempt by creditors to oust Howard Hughes from control of Trans World Airlines. The creditors provided Charles C. Tillinghast Jr. an employment contract that included a clause that would pay him money if he lost his job.

The use of golden parachutes expanded greatly in the early 1980s in response to the large increase in the number of takeovers and mergers. American executive pay practices were subject to increasing public scrutiny in the 1980s. During the 1980s hostile takeover wave, the practice of using golden parachutes in an executive's compensation package began to spread rapidly. By 1981, some 15% of the 250 largest U.S. corporations had golden parachutes in place.

In Europe the highest "change-in-control benefits" have been for French executives, as of 2006 according to a study by the Hay Group human resource management firm. French executives receive roughly double their combined salary and bonus amounts in their golden parachute.

News reference volume of the term "golden parachute" spiked in late 2008 during the global economic recession, and 2008 US presidential debates. Despite the poor economy, in the two years before 2012 a study by the professional services firm Alvarez & Marsal found a 32% increase in the value of "change-in-control benefits" provided to US executives. In late 2011, USA Today reported several CEO retirement packages in excess of $100 million, "raising eyebrows even among those accustomed to oversized payouts".

In the 1980s, golden parachutes prompted shareholder suits challenging the parachutes' validity, SEC "termination agreement disclosure rules" in 1986, and provisions in the Deficit Reduction Act of 1984 aimed at limiting the size of future parachutes with a special tax on payouts that topped three times annual pay. In the 1990s in the United States, some government efforts were made to diminish "change-in-control benefits". As of 1996, Section 280G of the Internal Revenue Code denies a corporation a deduction for any excess "parachute payment" made to a departing employee, and Section 4999 imposes on the recipient a nondeductible 20% excise tax, in addition to regular income and Social Security taxes.

The 2010 United States Dodd-Frank Act includes in its provisions a mandate for shareholder votes on any future adoption of a golden parachute by publicly traded firms. In Switzerland, a referendum which "would give shareholders the power to veto executive pay plans, including golden parachutes" was put to a vote on March 3, 2013. Voters approved measures limiting CEO pay and outlawing golden parachutes.

=== Studies and reports ===
One study found golden parachutes associated with an increased likelihood of either receiving an acquisition offer or being acquired, a lower premium (in share price) in case of an acquisition, and higher (unconditional) expected acquisition premiums. It found firms adopting golden parachutes have lower market value compared to assets of the company and that their value continues to decline during and after adopting golden parachutes.

"Gratuitous" payments made to CEOs on agreeing to have their companies acquired (i.e. payments made to CEOs by the acquiring company not mandated under the CEO's contract at the time the company is acquired) have been criticized. A "prominent" mergers and acquisitions lawyer told the New York Times that "I have had a number of situations where we've gone to management looking to do a deal and been stopped at the door until a compensation arrangement was signed, sealed, and delivered." Another lawyer told the Times: "Publicly, we have to call these things retention bonuses. Privately, sometimes it's the only way we would have got the deal done. It's a kickback."

A study investigating acquirer-paid sweeteners at 311 large-firm acquisitions completed between 1995 and 1997 found that CEOs of the acquired companies accept lower acquisition premiums when the acquirer promised them a high-ranking managerial post after the acquisition.

Golden parachutes are often viewed as excessive due to the substantial payouts given to senior management after an acquisition. This is further seen as excessive because other stakeholders during these acquisitions can be subject to layoffs. Golden parachutes can preserve a firms value for all stakeholders and are set in place to protect CEO’s during potential takeover situations.

On June 24, 2013, The Wall Street Journal reported that McKesson Corporation chairman and CEO John Hammergren's pension benefits of $159 million had set a record for "the largest pension on file for a current executive of a public company, and almost certainly the largest ever in corporate America." A study in 2012 by GMI Ratings, which tracks executive pay, found that 60% of CEOs at S&P 500 companies have pensions, and their value averages $11.5 million.

On June 29, 2013, The New York Times reported on research findings suggesting that "despite years of public outcry against such deals, multimillion-dollar severance packages are still common", and they continue to become "more complex and opaque".

== Arguments for and against ==
=== Support ===
Proponents of golden parachutes argue that they provide benefits to stockholders:

- Make it easier to hire and retain executives, especially in industries more prone to mergers.
- Help an executive to remain objective about the company during the takeover process, and possible loss of position after takeover.
- Dissuade takeover attempts by increasing the cost of a takeover, often part of a poison pill strategy.
- It helps the CEO to implement long-term targets thereby increasing revenue of the organisation (Mapetuse 2018)

=== Opposition ===
Critics have pointed out that:

- Dismissal is a risk in any occupation, and executives are already well compensated.
- Executives already have a fiduciary responsibility to the company, and should not need additional incentives to stay objective.
- Golden parachute costs are a very small percentage of a takeover's costs and do not affect the outcome.
- Benefits create perverse incentives.

== See also ==
- Golden handcuffs
- Golden handshake
- Poison pill
