= White knight (business) =

Friendly investor that acquires a corporation at fair consideration & support from board

In business, a white knight is a friendly investor that acquires a corporation at a fair consideration with support from the corporation's board of directors and management. This may be during a period while it is facing a hostile acquisition from another potential acquirer (black knight) or it is facing bankruptcy. White knights are preferred by the board of directors (when directors are acting in good faith with regard to the interest of the corporation and its shareholders) and/or management as in most cases as they do not replace the current board or management with a new board, whereas, in most cases, a black knight will seek to replace the current board of directors and/or management with its new board reflective of its net interest in the corporation's equity.

The first type, the white knight, refers to the friendly acquirer of a target firm in a hostile takeover attempt by another firm. The intent of the acquisition is to circumvent the takeover of the object of interest by a third, unfriendly entity, which is perceived to be less favorable. The knight might defeat the undesirable entity by offering a higher and more enticing bid, or strike a favorable deal with the management of the object of acquisition.

The second type refers to the acquirer of a struggling firm that may not necessarily be under threat by a hostile firm. The financial standing of the struggling firm could prevent any other entity being interested in an acquisition. The firm may already have huge debts to pay to its creditors, or worse, may already be bankrupt. In such a case, the knight, under huge risk, acquires the firm in crisis. After acquisition, the knight then rebuilds, or integrates the firm.

A number of variations of the term have been used and these include: a gray knight which is an acquiring corporation or individual that enters a bid for a hostile takeover in addition to the target firm and first bidder, perceived as more favorable than the black knight (unfriendly bidder), but less favorable than the white knight (friendly bidder). Also, a white squire, which is similar to a white knight except it only exercises a significant minority stake, as opposed to a majority stake. A white squire does not have the intention, but rather serves as a figurehead in defense of a hostile takeover. The white squire may often also get special voting rights for their equity stake.

== Hostile firms' strategies ==
- The strategy that is usually employed by a hostile firm is making an offer more lucrative than the white knight's, so that the shareholders consider rejecting the white knight's bid. This, however, can lead to bidding wars and finally to overpaying, by one or the other, for the target firm.
- Another option is known as the "NL strategy". Here, the hostile firm allows the white knight to move ahead and waits for the acquisition to take place. Once things are settled between the two entities, the hostile firm launches a takeover offer for the white knight. This takeover offer is generally a hostile one. The target (firm being bid on) can enter into standstill agreements with the white knight to prevent it from turning into a gray knight.

== Examples ==
- 1953 – United Paramount Theaters buys nearly bankrupt ABC
- 1980 – Renault buys a controlling stake in American Motors, which saves the struggling American automaker from bankruptcy
- 1982 – Allied Corporation buys Bendix Corporation in a situation involving the "Pac-Man defense". Allied is drafted in when the company that Bendix tries a hostile takeover on fights back by buying up Bendix stock in attempt to create a reverse hostile takeover.
- 1984 – Chevron Corporation acquired Gulf Oil after Gulf tried being a white knight to Citgo in 1982 in order for Citgo to avoid a hostile takeover by T. Boone Pickens. Pickens then turned his attention to Gulf, leading to the Chevron–Gulf deal.
- 1984 – Sid Bass and his sons buying significant interest in Walt Disney Productions as a defense against Saul Steinberg's hostile bid for the company.
- 1987 – Kluwer Publishers merges with Wolters Samson as a defensive move against an attempted hostile takeover of Kluwer by Elsevier
- 1998 – Compaq merges with financially weak DEC
- 2001 – Dynegy attempts to merge with Enron to cover Enron's massive debts (the merger failed as it became obvious that Enron had been committing fraud, resulting in the Enron scandal)
- 2003 – SAP was seen by analysts as the most likely to help defeat Oracle's hostile bid for PeopleSoft, but it came to nothing
- 2006 – Severstal almost acted as a white knight to Arcelor as the merger negotiations were in place between Arcelor and Mittal Steel Company
- 2006 – Bayer acted as a white knight to Schering as the merger negotiations were in place between Schering and Merck KGaA
- 2007 – Nissin Foods launches a friendly 37bn yen ($314m; £166m) bid for Myojo Foods after US hedge fund Steel Partners offered 29bn yen to buy the firm.
- 2008 – JPMorgan Chase acquires Bear Stearns allowing Bear Stearns to avoid insolvency after Bear Stearns stock price suffered a precipitous decline, with its market capitalization dropping by 92%.
- 2008 – Volkswagen acquires Porsche, after Porsche launched a hostile takeover of Volkswagen by purchasing enough Volkswagen shares to control 75% of the company at one point. During the 2008 financial crisis, Porsche ran out of funding and was at risk of insolvency. Volkswagen both performed a Pac-Man defense and acted as a white knight to Porsche by lending them enough money to stay solvent, with the consequence being that Porsche was absorbed into Volkswagen. This unusual situation occurred because of the shared history between the two companies, and that the chairman of Volkswagen at the time was Ferdinand Piëch, a descendant of Ferdinand Porsche, a co-founder of Volkswagen before founding his eponymous company, and Piëch's family had deep ties to both companies.
- 2008 – PNC Financial Services buys National City Corp. after National City was denied TARP funds in order to stay afloat due to increasing concerns that National City would fail due to the subprime mortgage crisis
- 2009 – Fiat S.p.A. takes over Chrysler, saving the struggling automaker from liquidation. The two companies eventually merge into Fiat Chrysler Automobiles.
- 2022 – FTX CEO Sam Bankman-Fried was called the "White Knight of Crypto" due to bailing out struggling cryptocurrency entities. He was also called the "J. P. Morgan of crypto", as J. P. Morgan had spent a considerable amount of his own money to shore up the banking system in the Panic of 1907. Ironically, FTX would spectacularly implode months later after FTX faced huge liquidity issues, for which Bankman-Fried himself would be arrested.

== See also ==
- Economics
- Industrial organization
- Microeconomics
