= Takeover =

Purchase of a company by another company

In business, a takeover is the purchase of one company (the target) by another (the acquirer or bidder). In the UK, the term refers only to the acquisition of a public company whose shares are publicly listed, in contrast to the acquisition of a private company.

Management of the target company may or may not agree with a proposed takeover, and this has resulted in the following takeover classifications: friendly, hostile, reverse or back-flip. Financing a takeover often involves loans or bond issues which may include junk bonds as well as a simple cash offer. It can also include shares in the new company.

== Takeover types ==
=== Friendly takeover ===
A friendly takeover is an acquisition which is approved by the management of the target company. Before a bidder makes an offer for another company, it usually first informs the company's board of directors.

In a private company, because the shareholders and the board are usually the same people or closely connected with one another, private acquisitions are usually friendly. If the shareholders agree to sell the company, then the board is usually of the same mind or sufficiently under the orders of the equity shareholders to cooperate with the bidder. This point is not relevant to the UK concept of takeovers, which always involve the acquisition of a public company.

A "bear hug" is an unsolicited takeover bid which is so generous that the shareholders of the target company are very likely to submit, accepting the offer.

=== Hostile takeover ===
A hostile takeover allows a bidder to take over a target company whose management is unwilling to agree to a merger or takeover. The party who initiates a hostile takeover bid approaches the shareholders directly, as opposed to seeking approval from officers or directors of the company. A takeover is considered hostile if the target company's board rejects the offer, and if the bidder continues to pursue it, or the bidder makes the offer directly after having announced its firm intention to make an offer. Development of the hostile takeover is attributed to Louis Wolfson. An SEC working paper tracking hostile takeovers from 1965 to 2013 found that such deals accounted for about 40% of total M&A activity in the late 1960s but declined to around 5% by 2013, making them a small share of overall takeover activity by the 2000s. (Note: The trend may not have been exclusively downwards; for example, another study has estimated that, in the year of 1986, only 40 takeovers out of 3,300 (1%) were hostile.) Additionally, a study of M&A transactions from 1990-2005 found that approximately 24% of hostile takeovers succeed.

A hostile takeover can be conducted in several ways. A tender offer can be made where the acquiring company makes a public offer at a fixed price above the current market price. An acquiring company can also engage in a proxy fight, whereby it tries to persuade enough shareholders, usually a simple majority, to replace the management with a new one which will approve the takeover. Another method involves quietly purchasing enough stock on the open market, known as a creeping tender offer or dawn raid, to effect a change in management. In all of these ways, management resists the acquisition, but it is carried out anyway.

In the United States, a common defense against hostile takeovers is to seek an injunction under Section 16 of the Clayton Act. The target company argues that the acquisition would violate Section 7 of the Act, which prohibits transactions that may substantially lessen competition or create a monopoly.

The main consequence of a bid being considered hostile is practical rather than legal. If the board of the target cooperates, the bidder can conduct extensive due diligence into the affairs of the target company, providing the bidder with a comprehensive analysis of the target company's finances. In contrast, a hostile bidder will only have more limited, publicly available information about the target company available, rendering the bidder vulnerable to hidden risks regarding the target company's finances. Since takeovers often require loans provided by banks in order to service the offer, banks are often less willing to back a hostile bidder because of the relative lack of target information which is available to them. Under Delaware law, boards must engage in defensive actions that are proportional to the hostile bidder's threat to the target company.

A well-known example of an extremely hostile takeover was Oracle's bid to acquire PeopleSoft. From 1985 to 2025, about 1,830 hostile takeovers with a total value of about US$3 trillion were announced, according to the Institute for Mergers, Acquisitions and Alliances.

=== Reverse takeover ===
A reverse takeover is a type of takeover where a private company acquires a public company. This is usually done at the instigation of the private company, the purpose being for the private company to effectively float itself while avoiding some of the expense and time involved in a conventional IPO. However, in the UK under AIM rules, a reverse takeover is an acquisition or acquisitions in a twelve-month period which for an AIM company would:

- exceed 100 percent in any of the class tests; or
- result in a fundamental change in its business, board or voting control; or
- in the case of an investing company, depart substantially from the investing strategy stated in its admission document or, where no admission document was produced on admission, depart substantially from the investing strategy stated in its pre-admission announcement or, depart substantially from the investing strategy.

An individual or organization, sometimes known as a corporate raider, can purchase a large fraction of the company's stock and, in doing so, get enough votes to replace the board of directors and the CEO. With a new agreeable management team, the stock is, potentially, a much more attractive investment, which might result in a price rise and a profit for the corporate raider and the other shareholders. A well-known example of a reverse takeover in the United Kingdom was Darwen Group's 2008 takeover of Optare plc. This was also an example of a back-flip takeover (see below) as Darwen was rebranded to the more well-known Optare name.

=== Backflip takeover ===
A backflip takeover is any sort of takeover in which the acquiring company turns itself into a subsidiary of the purchased company. This type of takeover can occur when a larger but less well-known company purchases a struggling company with a very well-known brand. Examples include:

- The Texas Air Corporation takeover of Continental Airlines but taking the Continental name as it was better known.
- The SBC takeover of the ailing AT&T and subsequent rename to AT&T.
- Westinghouse's 1995 purchase of CBS and 1997 renaming to CBS Corporation, with Westinghouse becoming a brand name owned by the company.
- NationsBank's takeover of the Bank of America, but adopting Bank of America's name.
- Norwest purchased Wells Fargo but kept the latter due to its name recognition and historical legacy in the American West.
- Interceptor Entertainment's acquisition of 3D Realms, but kept the name 3D Realms.
- Nordic Games buying THQ assets and trademark and renaming itself to THQ Nordic.
- Infogrames Entertainment, SA becoming Atari SA.
- The Avago Technologies takeover of Broadcom Corporation and subsequent rename to Broadcom Inc.
- Overkill Software's takeover of Starbreeze.

== Takeover financing ==
=== Funding ===
Often a company acquiring another pays a specified amount for it. This money can be raised in a number of ways. Although the company may have sufficient funds available in its account, remitting payment entirely from the acquiring company's cash on hand is unusual. More often, it will be borrowed from a bank, or raised by an issue of bonds. Acquisitions financed through debt are known as leveraged buyouts, and the debt will often be moved down onto the balance sheet of the acquired company. The acquired company then has to pay back the debt. This is a technique often used by private equity companies. The debt ratio of financing can go as high as 80% in some cases. In such a case, the acquiring company would only need to raise 20% of the purchase price.

=== Loan note alternatives ===
Cash offers for public companies often include a "loan note alternative" that allows shareholders to take a part or all of their consideration in loan notes rather than cash. This is done primarily to make the offer more attractive in terms of taxation. A conversion of shares into cash is counted as a disposal that triggers a payment of capital gains tax, whereas if the shares are converted into other securities, such as loan notes, the tax is rolled over.

== Takeover deals ==
=== All-share deals ===
A takeover, particularly a reverse takeover, may be financed by an all-share deal. The bidder does not pay money, but instead issues new shares in itself to the shareholders of the company being acquired. In a reverse takeover the shareholders of the company being acquired end up with a majority of the shares in, and so control of, the company making the bid. The company has managerial rights.

=== All-cash deals ===
If a takeover of a company consists of simply an offer of an amount of money per share (as opposed to all or part of the payment being in shares or loan notes), then this is an all-cash deal.

The purchasing company can source the necessary cash in a variety of ways, including existing cash resources, loans, or a separate issue of company shares.

== Mechanics ==
=== In the United Kingdom ===
Takeovers in the UK (meaning acquisitions of public companies only) are governed by the City Code on Takeovers and Mergers, also known as the 'City Code' or 'Takeover Code'. The rules for a takeover can be found in what is primarily known as 'The Blue Book'. The Code used to be a non-statutory set of rules that was controlled by city institutions on a theoretically voluntary basis. However, as a breach of the Code brought such reputational damage and the possibility of exclusion from city services run by those institutions, it was regarded as binding. In 2006, the Code was put onto a statutory footing as part of the UK's compliance with the European Takeover Directive (2004/25/EC).

The Code requires that all shareholders in a company should be treated equally. It regulates when and what information companies must and cannot release publicly in relation to the bid, sets timetables for certain aspects of the bid, and sets minimum bid levels following a previous purchase of shares.

In particular:

- a shareholder must make an offer when its shareholding, including that of parties acting in concert (a "concert party"), reaches 30% of the target;
- information relating to the bid must not be released except by announcements regulated by the Code;
- the bidder must make an announcement if rumour or speculation have affected a company's share price;
- the level of the offer must not be less than any price paid by the bidder in the twelve months before the announcement of a firm intention to make an offer;
- if shares are bought during the offer period at a price higher than the offer price, the offer must be increased to that price;

The Rules Governing the Substantial Acquisition of Shares, which used to accompany the Code and which regulated the announcement of certain levels of shareholdings, have now been abolished, though similar provisions still exist in the Companies Act 1985.

== Strategies ==
There are a variety of reasons why an acquiring company may wish to purchase another company. Some takeovers are opportunistic – the target company may simply be very reasonably priced for one reason or another and the acquiring company may decide that in the long run, it will end up making money by purchasing the target company. The large holding company Berkshire Hathaway has profited well over time by purchasing many companies opportunistically in this manner.

Other takeovers are strategic in that they are thought to have secondary effects beyond the simple effect of the profitability of the target company being added to the acquiring company's profitability. For example, an acquiring company may decide to purchase a company that is profitable and has good distribution capabilities in new areas which the acquiring company can use for its own products as well. A target company might be attractive because it allows the acquiring company to enter a new market without having to take on the risk, time and expense of starting a new division. An acquiring company could decide to take over a competitor not only because the competitor is profitable, but in order to eliminate competition in its field and make it easier, in the long term, to raise prices. Also a takeover could fulfill the belief that the combined company can be more profitable than the two companies would be separately due to a reduction of redundant functions.

== Executive compensation ==
Takeovers may also benefit from a principal-agent problem associated with top executive compensation. For example, it is fairly easy for a top executive to reduce the price of their company's stock due to information asymmetry. The executive can accelerate accounting of expected expenses, delay accounting of expected revenue, engage in off-balance-sheet transactions to make the company's profitability appear temporarily poorer, or simply promote and report severely conservative (i.e. pessimistic) estimates of future earnings. Such seemingly adverse earnings news will be likely to (at least temporarily) reduce the company's stock price. (This is again due to information asymmetries since it is more common for top executives to do everything they can to window dress their company's earnings forecasts.) There are typically very few legal risks to being 'too conservative' in one's accounting and earnings estimates.

A reduced share price makes a company an easier takeover target. When the company gets bought out (or taken private), the takeover artist gains a windfall from the former top executive's actions to reduce the company's stock price. This can represent tens of billions of dollars (questionably) transferred from previous shareholders to the takeover artist. The former top executive is then rewarded with a golden handshake for presiding over the fire sale that can sometimes be in the hundreds of millions of dollars for one or two years of work. This is nevertheless an excellent bargain for the takeover artist, who will tend to benefit from developing a reputation of being very generous to parting top executives. This is just one example of a principal-agent problem, otherwise regarded as perverse incentive.

Similar issues occur when a publicly held asset or non-profit organization undergoes privatization. Top executives often reap tremendous monetary benefits when a government owned or non-profit entity is sold to private hands. Just as in the example above, they can facilitate this process by making the entity appear to be in financial crisis. This perception can reduce the sale price (to the profit of the purchaser) and make non-profits and governments more likely to sell. It can also contribute to a public perception that private entities are more efficiently run, reinforcing the political will to sell off public assets.

== Debt for equity ==
Takeovers also tend to substitute debt for equity. In a sense, any government tax policy of allowing for deduction of interest expenses but not of dividends, has essentially provided a substantial subsidy to takeovers. It can punish more-conservative or prudent management that does not allow their companies to leverage themselves into a high-risk position. High leverage will lead to high profits if circumstances go well but can lead to catastrophic failure if they do not. This can create substantial negative externalities for governments, employees, suppliers and other stakeholders.

== Golden share ==
Corporate takeovers occur frequently in the United States, Canada, United Kingdom, France and Spain. They happen only occasionally in Italy because larger shareholders (typically controlling families) often have special board voting privileges designed to keep them in control. They do not happen often in Germany because of the dual board structure, nor in Japan because companies have interlocking sets of ownerships known as keiretsu, nor in the People's Republic of China because many publicly listed companies are state owned.

== Tactics against hostile takeover ==
There are quite a few tactics or techniques which can be used to deter a hostile takeover.

- Bankmail
- Crown jewel defense
- Golden parachute
- Greenmail
- Killer bees
- Leveraged recapitalization
- Lobster trap
- Lock-up provision
- Nancy Reagan defense
- Non-voting stock
- Pac-Man defense
- Poison pill (shareholder rights plan)
  - Flip-in
  - Flip-over
  - Jonestown defense
  - Pension parachute
  - People pill
  - Voting plans
- Safe harbor
- Scorched-earth defense
- Staggered board of directors
- Standstill agreement
- Targeted repurchase
- Top-ups
- Treasury stock
- Gray knight
- White knight
- Whitemail

== See also ==
- Breakup fee
- Concentration of media ownership
- Control premium
- List of largest mergers and acquisitions
- Mergers and acquisitions
- Revlon, Inc. v. MacAndrews & Forbes Holdings, Inc.
- Scrip bid
- Squeeze out
- Successor company
- Transformational acquisition

== Works cited ==
- Picot, Gerhard, ed. (2002). Handbook of International Mergers and Acquisitions: Preparation, Implementation, and Integration. Palgrave Macmillan. ISBN 0-333-96867-0. OCLC 48588374.
