= Greenmail =

Term in finance

Greenmail or greenmailing is a financial maneuver where investors buy enough shares in a target company to threaten a hostile takeover, prompting the target company to buy back the shares at a premium to prevent the takeover.

Corporate raids involve hostile takeovers of undervalued companies, sometimes through asset stripping or pressuring the sale of valuable assets like real estate. Greenmailers may offer to sell back their shares to the target company at a premium, resulting in losses for the company and its shareholders.

The tactic was used by investors such as T. Boone Pickens and James Goldsmith in the 1980s, who made profits by pressuring companies into repurchasing shares at a premium. For instance, Goldsmith's group acquired stakes in companies like St. Regis, prompting buybacks at a higher price and yielding substantial profits.

Greenmail is a complex corporate strategy, but legal restrictions and counter-tactics, like imposing limits on formal bids and a 50% excise tax on gains in the United States, have made it less common since the early 1990s.

== Term ==
The term is a financial neologism, coined in the 1980s, from blackmail and greenback as commentators and journalists saw the practice of corporate raiders as attempts by well-financed individuals, or their operating companies, to blackmail a company into handing over money by using the threat of a takeover.

== Tactic ==
Corporate raids occasionally aim to generate large amounts of money by hostile takeovers of large, often undervalued or inefficient (i.e. non-profit-maximizing) companies, by either asset stripping and/or replacing management and employees. In other circumstances, the greenmailer seeks out assets the target company has built up as equity, such as real estate, and attempts to have the target company dispose of those assets and lease them back via a recurring lease payment, while returning the sold-off real estate to shareholders as a special dividend.

The greenmail strategy has evolved since its first practices with ways to counter greenmail, other variations of greenmail, as well as ways to reinforce a greenmail tactic. In the area of mergers and acquisitions, the greenmail payment is made in an attempt to stop the hostile takeover.

One example of this practice was the attempted takeover by William Ackman's Pershing Square Capital Management of American retailer Target, which had a large inventory of mature or nearly mature real estate properties in its corporate portfolio. Ackman attempted to have these assets spun off as an IPO, along with a partial sale of Target's credit card unit and the execution of share buybacks, which reduce the number of shares outstanding by using corporate equity and earnings to repurchase existing shareholders' positions.

Once having secured a large share of a target company, instead of completing the hostile takeover, the greenmailer offers to end the threat to the victim company by selling his share back to it, but at a substantial premium to the fair market stock price.

From the viewpoint of the target, the ransom payment may be referred to as a goodbye kiss. The origin of the term goodbye kiss as a business metaphor is unclear. In reference to a President, Chairman, or CEO in charge of a target company being taken over, there are many situations in which a golden parachute is provided. A company which agrees to buy back the bidder's stockholding in the target avoids being taken over. In return, the bidder agrees to momentarily abandon the takeover attempt and may sign a confidential agreement with the greenmailee, guaranteeing not to resume the maneuver for a period of time.

While benefiting the corporate raider, the company and the company's shareholders lose money. Greenmail also momentarily protects the company's existing management and employees from termination, demotion, or reduction in wages, which would have most certainly seen their ranks reduced or eliminated had the hostile takeover successfully gone through.

== Examples ==
Greenmail proved lucrative for investors such as T. Boone Pickens and Sir James Goldsmith during the 1980s. In the latter example, Goldsmith made $90 million from the Goodyear Tire and Rubber Company in the 1980s in this manner. In 1984, Occidental Petroleum paid $194 million greenmail to David Murdock.

The St. Regis Paper Company provides an example of greenmail. When an investor group led by Sir James Goldsmith acquired an 8.6% stake in St. Regis and expressed interest in taking over the paper concern, the company agreed to repurchase the shares at a premium. Goldsmith's group acquired the shares for an average price of $35.50 per share, a total of $109 million. It sold its stake at $52 per share, netting a profit of $51 million. Shortly after the payoff in March 1984, St. Regis became the target of publisher Rupert Murdoch. St Regis turned to Champion International and agreed to a $1.84 billion takeover. Murdoch tendered his 5.6% stake in St. Regis to the Champion offer for a profit.

In a fictional context, greenmail tactics are prominently used in the 1987 film Wall Street. At one point, fellow corporate raider Sir Larry Wildman refers to Gordon Gekko as "a two-bit pirate and a greenmailer."

=== 2024 Ohio case ===
In 2021, a plaintiff's law firm tried to sue two so-called "activist" investors in a Franklin County, Ohio court, alleging that the investors violated Ohio's law against greenmailing. Law firm Robbins Geller Rudman & Dowd LLP represented the Corpus Christi Firefighters’ Retirement System and filed the suit against two investment firms. In the suit, the plaintiff alleged that Macellum and Ancora attempted to engage in a greenmail campaign against Big Lots, a publicly traded discount retailer. Ohio's statute would force the investors to give up any profits it earned from ownership of Big Lots stock if they had engaged in greenmailing. However, the investors did not make any such attempt, according to RealClearMarkets. In March 2024, Ohio Judge Daniel Hawkins – who was running for, and was later elected to, the Ohio Supreme Court – dismissed the case.

=== Other cases ===
- Viacom Int'l, Inc. v. Icahn, 747 F. Supp. 205 (S.D.N.Y. 1990)
- Polk v. Good, 507 A.2d 531 (Del. 1986).

A Harvard Business School case study in 1990 pointed to the repeated use of greenmail attempts by the Walt Disney Company - "a much criticized defensive tactic which Disney uses trying to buy enough time to fix its investment and financial strategies."

In 2003, Michael Ashcroft was criticised by the High Court judge, Mr Justice Peter Smith in Rock (Nominees) Ltd v RCO (Holdings) Plc. Smith condemned Ashcroft's tactics in relation to the takeover of cleaning company RCO by the Danish firm ISS. Smith said,

Euphemistically this practice – which I understand is a not unheard-of practice in the City [of London] – is described as "greenmail". The proper word to my mind is blackmail. It is the kind of thing which brings the City into disrepute ...

— Justice Peter Smith

== History ==
Greenmail's use, as a strategy, is one of many corporate finance tactics. The most cited 20th century legal precedents of stock manipulation, which set the foundation for tactics like Greenmail, were:

=== Cases ===
- United States v. Charnay, 537 F.2d 341 (1976) Legal Precedent
- The United States v. Charnay, 577 F.2d 81 (1978) Legal Precedent
- United States v. Wolfson, 405 F.2d 779 (2d Cir.1968) illegal, Conviction
- Gilette and Revlon
- New World and Four Star

Significant pre-20th century precedents of stock manipulation, which set the foundation for tactics like Greenmail, were:

=== Historic examples ===
Examples include:

- Grant and Ward
- J.P. Morgan
- William Vanderbilt
- William Duer

== Prevention tactics ==
Greenmail is a financially sophisticated corporate business tactic, and many counter-tactics have been applied to defend against and to financially engineer the reception of a greenmail. There is a legal requirement in some jurisdictions for companies to impose limits for launching formal bids. United States Federal tax treatment of greenmail gains (a 50% excise tax), legal restrictions, as well as counter-tactics have all made greenmail far less common since the early 1990s (see 26 U.S.C. § 5881, and 26 C.F.R. Part 156, notably § 156.5881-1 ff.).

Some U.S. states have enacted laws prohibiting greenmailing. In Ohio, for example, a state statute makes it illegal for someone who has made the intention of trying to acquire control of a company from disposing of their shares in that company within 18 months after making the intention. New York's anti-greenmail law prohibits a corporation from buying back more than 10 percent of its stock from a shareholder for more than market value. It is only allowed if it is approved by both the board of directors and a majority of shareholders (excluding the shareholder in question attempting to sell back the stock).

== See also ==
- Insider trading
- Watered stock
- Stock dilution
- Pump and dump
- Stock bashing
