= Pac-Man defense =

Tactic to counteract a hostile takeover

The Pac-Man defense is a defensive business strategy used to stave off a hostile takeover, in which a company that is threatened with a hostile takeover "turns the tables" by attempting to acquire its would-be buyer. The name refers to Pac-Man, a video game in which the protagonist is at first chased around a maze of dots by four ghosts. However, after eating a "Power Pellet" dot, he is able to chase and devour the ghosts. The term (though not the technique) was coined by buyout guru Bruce Wasserstein.

== Examples ==
=== United States ===
When T. Boone Pickens's Mesa Petroleum planned a tender offer for Cities Service in 1981, Freeport-McMoran and Louisiana Land & Exploration agreed to help him. An investment banker working for Cities Service warned Freeport and Louisiana Land in August 1981 that if they did not end their partnership with Pickens, Cities Service would take them over; the threat succeeded. When Pickens found new partners including Southland Corporation, Cities Service announced in May 1982 its own tender offer for Mesa, and also threatened to take over Southland.

A major example in U.S. corporate history is the attempted hostile takeover of Martin Marietta by Bendix Corporation in 1982. In response, Martin Marietta started buying Bendix stock with the aim of assuming control over the company. Bendix persuaded Allied Corporation to act as a white knight, and the company was sold to Allied the same year.

In 1984, U.S. Securities and Exchange Commission commissioners said that the Pac-Man defense was cause for “serious concern,” but balked at endorsing any federal prohibition against the tactic. The commissioners acknowledged a Pac-Man defense can benefit shareholders under certain circumstances, but emphasized that management, in resorting to this tactic, must bear the burden of proving it is not acting solely out of its desire to stay in office. One concern is that the money spent to gain control of the intruding company, which includes payment for the services of lawyers and other professionals needed to mount that defense, represents substantial funds that could have otherwise been used to improve the company’s business or increase its profits.

The next Pac-Man defense occurred in 1988, when American Brands, fighting a hostile takeover attempt by E-II Holdings, announced a cash tender offer for E-II. In 2007, British mining giant Rio Tinto, fighting off an unsolicited $131.57 billion takeover bid from Australian rival BHP Billiton, considered turning the tables on its rival and launching a counterbid for BHP. In 2009, Cadbury considered trying a Pac-Man defense if no bid emerged to challenge Kraft Foods' hostile offer.

=== International ===
Internationally, perhaps the best-known case was that of Porsche and the Volkswagen Group, in which Porsche, under the leadership of Wendelin Wiedeking, led a hostile takeover of the much-larger Volkswagen Group by slowly acquiring a large stake in Volkswagen, eventually to the point of owning over 75% of the company in 2008 and potentially triggering Germany's "Volkswagen law". By October 2008, Porsche, which was enjoying record profitability, suddenly ran out of money during the 2008 financial crisis and banks were reluctant to lend any more money to Porsche; in fact, they wanted their loans paid back immediately. Ferdinand Piëch, the chairman of Volkswagen and a board member of Porsche, loaned Porsche enough money to cover their debts, and Volkswagen, which Porsche tried to acquire, became the white knight and Volkswagen effectively took over Porsche. The unique situation had much to do with the historical closeness of the Volkswagen Group to Porsche, and the battle between the Porsche and Piëch families (both descended from Ferdinand Porsche) for control of Porsche, although both families supported the deal. However, later that year when the two companies announced an official merger, Volkswagen was announced as the surviving partner.

== Bibliography ==
- Big Deal: The Battle for the Control of America's Leading Corporations, Bruce Wasserstein, (1988, ISBN 0-446-67521-0)
- Pac-Man Defense http://www.investopedia.com/terms/p/pac-man-defense.asp

== See also ==
- Reverse takeover
