= Mergers and acquisitions =

Processes through which companies combine or transfer ownership

Mergers and acquisitions (M&A) are business transactions whereby the ownership of a company, business organization, or one of their operating units is transferred to or consolidated with another entity. They may happen through direct absorption, a merger, a tender offer or a hostile takeover. As a central aspect of corporate strategy and strategic management, M&A activity enables companies to expand, diversify, restructure, or realign their competitive position.

In legal terms, a merger is the consolidation of two entities into a single legal entity, whereas an acquisition occurs when one entity takes ownership of another entity's share capital, equity interests or assets. Both typically result in assets, liabilities, and operations being combined under unified control, and a transaction described as a merger may economically resemble an acquisition, and vice versa.

M&A transactions are governed by corporate law and are typically subject to regulatory review, particularly under competition (antitrust) law. Many countries require notification and review of proposed mergers to allow the government to assess their potential effects on market competition. In the United States, for example, the Clayton Act prohibits any merger or acquisition that may "substantially lessen competition" or "tend to create a monopoly", and the Hart–Scott–Rodino Act requires providing advance notice to the U.S. Department of Justice and the Federal Trade Commission of any merger or acquisition over a certain size.

Deals between companies in different countries are called cross-border mergers and acquisitions. They have become more common as economies have globalised. Buyers face extra hurdles, such as foreign regulatory approval and differences in law, culture and business practice. These differences are often larger in emerging economies, where property rights may be weaker and financial information less reliable.

== Acquisition ==
An acquisition/takeover is the purchase of one business or company by another company or other business entity. Specific acquisition targets can be identified through myriad avenues, including market research, trade expos, sent up from internal business units, or supply chain analysis. Such purchase may be of 100%, or nearly 100%, of the assets or ownership equity of the acquired entity.

A consolidation/amalgamation occurs when two companies combine to form a new enterprise altogether, and neither of the previous companies remains independently owned. Acquisitions are divided into "private" and "public" acquisitions, depending on whether the acquiree or merging company (also termed a target) is or is not publicly listed. Some public companies rely on acquisitions as an important value creation strategy. An additional dimension or categorization consists of whether an acquisition is friendly or hostile.

Achieving acquisition success has proven to be very difficult, while various studies have shown that 50% of acquisitions were unsuccessful. "Serial acquirers" appear to be more successful with M&A than companies who make acquisitions only occasionally (see Douma & Schreuder, 2013, chapter 13). The new forms of buy out created since the 2008 financial crisis are based on serial type acquisitions known as an ECO Buyout which is a co-community ownership buy out and the new generation buy outs of the MIBO (Management Involved or Management & Institution Buy Out) and MEIBO (Management & Employee Involved Buy Out).

Whether a purchase is perceived as being "friendly" or "hostile" depends significantly on how the proposed acquisition is communicated to and perceived by the target company's board of directors, employees, and shareholders. It is normal for M&A deal communications to take place in a so-called "confidentiality bubble", wherein the flow of information is restricted pursuant to confidentiality agreements. In the case of a friendly transaction, the companies cooperate in negotiations; in the case of a hostile deal, the board and/or management of the target is unwilling to be bought or the target's board has no prior knowledge of the offer. Hostile acquisitions can, and often do, ultimately become "friendly" as the acquirer secures endorsement of the transaction from the board of the acquiree company. This usually requires an improvement in the terms of the offer and/or through negotiation.

"Acquisition" usually refers to a purchase of a smaller firm by a larger one. Sometimes, however, a smaller firm will acquire management control of a larger and/or longer-established company and retain the name of the latter for the post-acquisition combined entity. This is known as a reverse takeover. Another type of acquisition is the reverse merger, a form of transaction that enables a private company to be publicly listed in a relatively short time frame. A reverse merger is a type of merger where a privately held company, typically one with promising prospects and a need for financing, acquires a publicly listed shell company that has few assets and no significant business operations.

The combined evidence suggests that the shareholders of acquired firms realize significant positive "abnormal returns," while shareholders of the acquiring company are most likely to experience a negative wealth effect. Most studies indicate that M&A transactions have a positive net effect, with investors in both the buyer and target companies seeing positive returns. This suggests that M&A creates economic value, likely by transferring assets to more efficient management teams who can better utilize them. (See Douma & Schreuder, 2013, chapter 13).

There are also a variety of structures used to secure control over the assets of a company, which have different tax and regulatory implications:

- The buyer buys the shares, and therefore control, of the target company being purchased. Ownership control of the company in turn conveys effective control over the assets of the company, but since the company is acquired intact as a going concern, this form of transaction carries with it all of the liabilities accrued by that business over its past and all of the risks that company faces in its commercial environment and corporate environment
- The buyer buys the assets of the target company. The cash the target receives from the sell-off is paid back to its shareholders by dividend or through liquidation. This type of transaction leaves the target company as an empty shell, if the buyer buys out the entire assets. A buyer often structures the transaction as an asset purchase to "cherry-pick" the assets that it wants and leave out the assets and liabilities that it does not. This can be particularly important where foreseeable liabilities may include future, unquantified damage awards such as those that could arise from litigation over defective products, employee benefits or terminations, or environmental damage. A disadvantage of this structure is the tax that many jurisdictions, particularly outside the United States, impose on transfers of the individual assets, whereas stock transactions can frequently be structured as like-kind exchanges or other arrangements that are tax-free or tax-neutral, both to the buyer and to the seller's shareholders.

As per knowledge-based views, firms can generate greater values through the retention of knowledge-based resources which they generate and integrate. Extracting technological benefits during and after acquisition is an ever-challenging issue because of organizational differences. Based on the content analysis of seven interviews, the authors concluded the following components for their grounded model of acquisition:

1. Improper documentation and changing implicit knowledge makes it difficult to share information during acquisition.
2. For acquired firm symbolic and cultural independence which is the base of technology and capabilities are more important than administrative independence.
3. Detailed knowledge exchange and integrations are difficult when the acquired firm is large and high performing.
4. Management of executives from acquired firm is critical in terms of promotions and pay incentives to utilize their talent and value their expertise.
5. Transfer of technologies and capabilities are most difficult task to manage because of complications of acquisition implementation. The risk of losing implicit knowledge is always associated with the fast pace acquisition.

An increase in acquisitions in the global business environment requires enterprises to evaluate the key stake holders of acquisitions very carefully before implementation. It is imperative for the acquirer to understand this relationship and apply it to its advantage. Employee retention is possible only when resources are exchanged and managed without affecting their independence.

=== Spin-off ===
The terms "demerger", "spin-off","corporate unbundling" and "spin-out" are sometimes used to indicate a situation where one company splits into two, generating a second company which may or may not become separately listed on a stock exchange. A "spin-off" is a type of divestiture in which a parent company separates one or more divisions to create a separate entity.

== Legal structures ==
A corporate acquisition can be structured legally as either an "asset purchase" in which the seller sells business assets and liabilities to the buyer, an "equity purchase" in which the buyer purchases equity interests in a target company from one or more selling shareholders, or a "merger" in which one legal entity is combined into another entity by operation of the corporate law statute(s) of the jurisdiction of the merging entities. In a transaction structured as a merger or an equity purchase, the buyer acquires all of the assets and liabilities of the acquired entity. In a transaction structured as an asset purchase, the buyer and seller agree on which assets and liabilities the buyer will acquire from the seller.

Asset purchases are common in technology transactions in which the buyer is most interested in particular intellectual property but does not want to acquire liabilities or other contractual relationships. An asset purchase structure may also be used when the buyer wishes to buy a particular division or unit of a company that is not a separate legal entity. Divestitures present a variety of unique challenges, such as identifying the assets and liabilities that pertain solely to the unit being sold, determining whether the unit relies on services from other parts of the seller's organization, transferring employees, moving permits and licenses, and safeguarding against potential competition from the seller in the same business sector after the transaction is completed.

=== Types of mergers ===
From an economic point of view, business combinations can also be classified as horizontal, vertical and conglomerate mergers (or acquisitions). A horizontal merger is between two competitors in the same industry. A vertical merger occurs when two firms combine across the value chain, such as when a firm buys a former supplier (backward integration) or a former customer (forward integration). When there is no strategic relatedness between an acquiring firm and its target, this is called a conglomerate merger (Douma & Schreuder, 2013).

The form of merger most often employed is a triangular merger, where the target company merges with a shell company wholly owned by the buyer, thus becoming a subsidiary of the buyer. In a "forward triangular merger", the target company merges into the subsidiary, with the subsidiary as the surviving company of the merger; a "reverse triangular merger" is similar except that the subsidiary merges into the target company, with the target company surviving the merger. Since the target company survives in a reverse triangular merger, its contracts, titles, and licenses stay intact rather than having to transfer title to the acquirer.

Mergers, asset purchases and equity purchases are each taxed differently, and the most beneficial structure for tax purposes is highly situation-dependent. Under the U.S. Internal Revenue Code, a forward triangular merger is taxed as if the target company sold its assets to the shell company and then liquidated, them whereas a reverse triangular merger is taxed as if the target company's shareholders sold their stock in the target company to the buyer.

Another form of merger is a "two-step merger" by which under certain state laws an acquisition can be completed without a shareholder vote. The first step is to conduct a tender offer for all the shares, usually with the condition of obtaining at least 50% of outstanding shares. The second step is to conduct a "short form merger," with no vote required. Two-step mergers can be closed faster than traditional one-step mergers because their regulatory review period is shorter.

== Documentation ==
The documentation of an M&A transaction often begins with a letter of intent. The letter of intent generally does not bind the parties to commit to a transaction, but may bind the parties to confidentiality and exclusivity obligations so that the transaction can be considered through a due diligence process. This due diligence process (sometimes referred to as “DD”) is intended to validate assumptions and mitigate risks. Its scope is often broad, involving lawyers, accountants, tax advisors, and other professionals, as well as teams of people from both sides.

After due diligence is complete, the parties may proceed to draw up a definitive agreement, known as a "merger agreement", "share purchase agreement," or "asset purchase agreement" depending on the structure of the transaction. Such contracts are typically 80 to 100 pages long and focus on five key types of terms:

- Conditions, which must be satisfied before there is an obligation to complete the transaction. Conditions typically include matters such as regulatory approvals and the lack of any material adverse change in the target's business.
- Representations and warranties by the seller with regard to the company, which are claimed to be true at both the time of signing and the time of closing. Sellers often attempt to craft their representations and warranties with knowledge qualifiers, dictating the level of knowledge applicable and which seller parties' knowledge is relevant. Some agreements provide that if the representations and warranties by the seller prove to be false, the buyer may claim a refund of part of the purchase price, as is common in transactions involving privately held companies (although in most acquisition agreements involving public company targets, the representations and warranties of the seller do not survive the closing). Representations regarding a target company's net working capital are a common source of post-closing disputes.
- Covenants, which govern the conduct of the parties, both before the closing (such as covenants that restrict the operations of the business between signing and closing) and after the closing (such as covenants regarding future income tax filings and tax liability or post-closing restrictions agreed to by the buyer and seller parties).
- Termination rights, which may be triggered by a breach of contract, a failure to satisfy certain conditions or the passage of a certain period of time without consummating the transaction, and fees and damages payable in case of a termination for certain events (also known as breakup fees).
- Provisions relating to obtaining required shareholder approvals under state law and related SEC filings required under federal law, if applicable, and terms related to the mechanics of the legal transactions to be consummated at closing (such as the determination and allocation of the purchase price) and post-closing adjustments (such as adjustments after the final determination of working capital at closing or earnout payments payable to the sellers), repayment of outstanding debt, and the treatment of outstanding shares, options and other equity interests).
- An indemnification provision, which provides that an indemnitor will indemnify, defend, and hold harmless the indemnitee(s) for losses incurred as a result of the indemnitor's breach of its contractual obligations in the purchase agreement

Following the closing of a deal, adjustments may be made to some of the provisions outlined in the purchase agreement, such as the purchase price. These adjustments are subject to enforceability issues in certain situations. Alternatively, certain transactions use the 'locked box' approach, where the purchase price is fixed at signing and is based on the seller's equity value at a pre-signing date, along with an interest charge.

== Business valuation ==
The assets of a business are pledged to two categories of stakeholders: equity owners and owners of the business' outstanding debt. The core value of a business, which accrues to both categories of stakeholders, is called the Enterprise Value (EV), whereas the value which accrues just to shareholders is the Equity Value (also called market capitalization for publicly listed companies). Enterprise Value reflects a capital structure neutral valuation and is frequently a preferred way to compare value as it is not affected by a company's, or management's, strategic decision to fund the business either through debt, equity, or a portion of both. Five common ways to "triangulate" the enterprise value of a business are:

1. asset valuation: the price paid is the value of the "easily salable parts"; the main approaches to valuing these are book value and liquidation value
2. historical earnings valuation: the price is such that the payment for the business (or return targeted by the investor), would have been supported by the business's own earnings or cash-flow averaged over the previous 3–5 years; see also Earnout
3. future maintainable earnings valuation: similarly, but forward looking; see generally, Cash flow forecasting and Financial forecast, and re "maintainability", Sustainable growth rate § From a financial perspective and Owner earnings.
4. relative valuation: the price paid per dollar of earnings or revenue is based on the same multiple for comparable companies and / or recent comparable transactions
5. discounted cash flow valuation (DCF): the price equates to the value of "all" future cash-flows - with synergies and tax given special attention - as discounted to today; see § Determine cash flow for each forecast period under Valuation using discounted cash flows, which compares M&A DCF models to other cases.

Professionals who value businesses generally do not use just one method, but a combination. Valuations implied using these methodologies can prove different to a company's current trading valuation. For public companies, the market based enterprise value and equity value can be calculated by referring to the company's share price and components on its balance sheet. The valuation methods described above represent ways to determine value of a company independently from how the market currently, or historically, has determined value based on the price of its outstanding securities.

Most often value is expressed in a Letter of Opinion of Value (LOV) when the business is being valued informally. Formal valuation reports generally get more detailed and expensive as the size of a company increases, but this is not always the case as the nature of the business and the industry it is operating in can influence the complexity of the valuation task.

Objectively evaluating the historical and prospective performance of a business is a challenge faced by many. Generally, parties rely on independent third parties to conduct due diligence studies or business assessments. To derive the most value from a business assessment, the objectives should be clearly defined, and the right resources should be chosen to conduct the assessment within the available timeframe.

As synergy plays a large role in the valuation of acquisitions, it is paramount to get the value of synergies right, as briefly alluded to regarding DCF valuations. Synergies are different from the "sales price" valuation of the firm, as they will accrue to the buyer. Hence, the analysis should be done from the acquiring firm's point of view. Synergy-creating investments are initiated by the choice of the acquirer, and therefore they are not obligatory, making them essentially real options. To include this real options aspect into the analysis of acquisition targets is an issue that has been studied lately. See also contingent value rights.

Valuation can be influenced by a range of factors beyond financial performance, including cross-border and cross-industry considerations, sustainability initiatives, and regulatory environments. Cross-border transactions may involve exchange rate risks, differing accounting standards, and geopolitical factors, which can lead to valuation adjustments. Cross-industry acquisitions can introduce complexities in synergies and market positioning, as firms may face integration challenges and differences in business models. Additionally, sustainability-related factors, such as a company's environmental, social, and governance performance, can impact valuation by influencing investor sentiment, access to capital, and long-term risk exposure. The Iran conflict made dealmakers more cautious, raising concerns that some M&A deals could be delayed.

== Financing ==
Mergers are generally differentiated from acquisitions partly by the way in which they are financed and partly by the relative size of the companies. Various methods of financing an M&A deal include:

=== Cash ===
Payment by cash. Such transactions are usually termed acquisitions rather than mergers because the shareholders of the target company are removed from the picture and the target comes under the (indirect) control of the bidder's shareholders.

=== Stock ===
Payment in the form of the acquiring company's stock, issued to the shareholders of the acquired company at a given ratio proportional to the valuation of the latter. They receive stock in the company that is purchasing the smaller subsidiary.

=== Financing options ===
There are some elements to think about when choosing the form of payment. When submitting an offer, the acquiring firm should consider other potential bidders and think strategically. The form of payment might be decisive for the seller. With pure cash deals, there is no doubt on the real value of the bid (without considering an eventual earnout). The contingency of the share payment is indeed removed. Thus, a cash offer preempts competitors better than securities. Taxes are a second element to consider and should be evaluated with the counsel of competent tax and accounting advisers. Third, with a share deal the buyer's capital structure might be affected and the control of the buyer modified. If the issuance of shares is necessary, shareholders of the acquiring company might prevent such capital increase at the general meeting of shareholders. The risk is removed with a cash transaction. Then, the balance sheet of the buyer will be modified and the decision maker should take into account the effects on the reported financial results. For example, in a pure cash deal (financed from the company's current account), liquidity ratios might decrease. On the other hand, in a pure stock for stock transaction (financed from the issuance of new shares), the company might show lower profitability ratios (e.g. ROA). However, economic dilution must prevail towards accounting dilution when making the choice. The form of payment and financing options are tightly linked. If the buyer pays cash, there are three main financing options:

- Cash on hand: it consumes financial slack (excess cash or unused debt capacity) and may decrease debt rating. There are no major transaction costs.
- Issue of debt: It consumes financial slack, may decrease debt rating and increase cost of debt.

== Specialist advisory firms ==
M&A advice is provided by full-service investment banks- who often advise and handle the biggest deals in the world (called bulge bracket) - and specialist M&A firms, who provide M&A only advisory, generally to mid-market, select industries and SBEs.

Highly focused and specialized M&A advice investment banks are called boutique investment banks.

== Motivation ==
=== Improving financial performance or reducing risk ===
The dominant rationale used to explain M&A activity is that acquiring firms seek improved financial performance or reduce risk. The following motives are considered to improve financial performance or reduce risk:

- Economy of scale: This refers to the fact that the combined company can often reduce its fixed costs by removing duplicate departments or operations, lowering the costs of the company relative to the same revenue stream, thus increasing profit margins.
- Economy of scope: This refers to the efficiencies primarily associated with demand-side changes, such as increasing or decreasing the scope of marketing and distribution, of different types of products.
- Increased revenue or market share: This assumes that the buyer will be absorbing a major competitor and thus increase its market power (by capturing increased market share) to set prices.
- Cross-selling: For example, a bank buying a stock broker could then sell its banking products to the stock broker's customers, while the broker can sign up the bank's customers for brokerage accounts. Or, a manufacturer can acquire and sell complementary products.
- Synergy: For example, managerial economies such as the increased opportunity of managerial specialization. Another example is purchasing economies due to increased order size and associated bulk-buying discounts.
- Taxation: A profitable company can buy a loss maker to use the target's loss as their advantage by reducing their tax liability. In the United States and many other countries, rules are in place to limit the ability of profitable companies to "shop" for loss making companies, limiting the tax motive of an acquiring company.
- Geographical or other diversification: This is designed to smooth the earnings results of a company, which over the long term smoothens the stock price of a company, giving conservative investors more confidence in investing in the company. However, this does not always deliver value to shareholders (see below).
- Resource transfer: resources are unevenly distributed across firms (Barney, 1991) and the interaction of target and acquiring firm resources can create value through either overcoming information asymmetry or by combining scarce resources.
- Vertical integration: Vertical integration occurs when an upstream and downstream firm merge (or one acquires the other). There are several reasons for this to occur. One reason is to internalise an externality problem. A common example of such an externality is double marginalization. Double marginalization occurs when both the upstream and downstream firms have monopoly power and each firm reduces output from the competitive level to the monopoly level, creating two deadweight losses. After a merger, the vertically integrated firm can collect one deadweight loss by setting the downstream firm's output to the competitive level. This increases profits and consumer surplus. A merger that creates a vertically integrated firm can be profitable. Vertical integration can, however, negatively affect other firms through market foreclosure channels.
- Hiring (acqui-hire): some companies use acquisitions as an alternative to the normal hiring process. This is especially common when the target is a small private company or is in the startup phase. In this case, the acquiring company simply hires ("acquhires") the staff of the target private company, thereby acquiring its talent (if that is its main asset and appeal). The target private company simply dissolves and few legal issues are involved.
- Absorption of similar businesses under single management: similar portfolio invested by two different mutual funds namely united money market fund and united growth and income fund, caused the management to absorb united money market fund into united growth and income fund.
- Access to hidden or nonperforming assets (land, real estate).
- Acquire innovative intellectual property. Nowadays, intellectual property has become one of the core competences for companies. Studies have shown that successful knowledge transfer and integration after a merger or acquisition has a positive impact to the firm's innovative capability and performance.
- Killer Acquisitions: Incumbent firms may acquire innovative targets solely to discontinue the target's innovation projects and preempt future competition.
- Exit Strategy: Some start-ups in technological and pharmaceutical industries explicitly cite a potential future acquisition as an "exit strategy" when seeking early VC funding. The potential for an acquisition therefore leads to higher levels of funding for risky or innovative projects.

Megadeals—deals of at least one $1 billion in size—tend to fall into four discrete categories: consolidation, capabilities extension, technology-driven market transformation, and going private.

=== Other types ===
On average and across the most commonly studied variables, acquiring firms' financial performance does not positively change as a function of their acquisition activity. Therefore, additional motives for merger and acquisition that may not add shareholder value include:

- Diversification: While this may hedge a company against a downturn in an individual industry it fails to deliver value, since it is possible for individual shareholders to achieve the same hedge by diversifying their portfolios at a much lower cost than those associated with a merger. (In his book One Up on Wall Street, Peter Lynch termed this "diworseification".)
- Manager's hubris: manager's overconfidence about expected synergies from M&A which results in overpayment for the target company. The effect of manager's overconfidence on M&A has been shown to hold both for CEOs and board directors.
- Empire-building: Managers have larger companies to manage and hence more power.
- Manager's compensation: In the past, certain executive management teams had their payout based on the total amount of profit of the company, instead of the profit per share, which would give the team a perverse incentive to buy companies to increase the total profit while decreasing the profit per share (which hurts the owners of the company, the shareholders).

== Different types ==
=== By functional roles in market ===
The M&A process itself is a multifaceted which depends upon the type of merging companies.

- A horizontal merger is usually between two companies in the same business sector. An example of horizontal merger would be if a video game publisher purchases another video game publisher, for instance, Square Enix acquiring Eidos Interactive. This means that synergy can be obtained through many forms such as; increased market share, cost savings and exploring new market opportunities.
- A vertical merger represents the buying of supplier of a business. In a similar example, if a video game publisher purchases a video game development company in order to retain the development studio's intellectual properties, for instance, Kadokawa Corporation acquiring FromSoftware. The vertical buying is aimed at reducing overhead cost of operations and economy of scale.
- Conglomerate M&A is the third form of M&A process which deals the merger between two irrelevant companies. The relevant example of conglomerate M&A would be if a video game publisher purchases an animation studio, for instance, when Sega Sammy Holdings subsidized TMS Entertainment. The objective is often diversification of goods and services and capital investment.

=== By business outcome ===
The M&A process results in the restructuring of a business's purpose, corporate governance and brand identity.

- A statutory merger is a merger in which the acquiring company survives and the target company dissolves. The purpose of this merger is to transfer the assets and capital of the target company into the acquiring company without having to maintain the target company as a subsidiary.
- A consolidated merger is a merger in which an entirely new legal company is formed through combining the acquiring and target company. The purpose of this merger is to create a new legal entity with the capital and assets of the merged acquirer and target company. Both the acquiring and target company are dissolved in the process.

=== Arm's length mergers ===
An arm's length merger is a merger:

1. approved by disinterested directors and
2. approved by disinterested stockholders:

″The two elements are complementary and not substitutes. The first element is important because the directors have the capability to act as effective and active bargaining agents, which disaggregated stockholders do not. But, because bargaining agents are not always effective or faithful, the second element is critical, because it gives the minority stockholders the opportunity to reject their agents' work. Therefore, when a merger with a controlling stockholder was: 1) negotiated and approved by a special committee of independent directors; and 2) conditioned on an affirmative vote of a majority of the minority stockholders, the business judgment standard of review should presumptively apply, and any plaintiff ought to have to plead particularized facts that, if true, support an inference that, despite the facially fair process, the merger was tainted because of fiduciary wrongdoing.″

=== Strategic mergers ===
A strategic merger usually refers to the long-term strategic holding of the target (acquired) firm. This type of M&A process aims to create synergies in the long run through increased market share, a broader customer base, and enhanced corporate strength. A strategic acquirer may also be willing to pay a premium to the target firm in anticipation of the synergy value created after the M&A process.

=== Acqui-hire ===
The term "acqui-hire" is used to refer to acquisitions where the acquiring company seeks to obtain the target company's talent, rather than their products (which are often discontinued as part of the acquisition so the team can focus on projects for their new employer). In recent years, these types of acquisitions have become common in the technology industry, where major web companies such as Facebook, Twitter, and Yahoo! have frequently used talent acquisitions to add expertise in particular areas to their workforces.

=== Merger of equals ===
Merger of equals is often a combination of companies of a similar size. Since 1990, there have been more than 625 M&A transactions announced as mergers of equals with a total value of US$2,164.4 bil. Some of the largest mergers of equals took place during the dot-com bubble of the late 1990s and in the year 2000: AOL and Time Warner (US$164 bil.), SmithKline Beecham and Glaxo Wellcome (US$75 bil.), Citicorp and Travelers Group (US$72 bil.). More recent examples this type of combinations are DuPont and Dow Chemical (US$62 bil.) and Praxair and Linde (US$35 bil.).

== Research and statistics for acquired organizations ==
An analysis of 1,600 companies across industries revealed the rewards for M&A activity were greater for consumer products companies than the average company. For the period 2000–2010, consumer products companies turned in an average annual TSR of 7.4%, while the average for all companies was 4.8%.

The cost of replacing an executive can exceed 100% of his or her annual salary, which can make retention a cost-efficient strategy.

== Brand considerations ==
Mergers and acquisitions often create brand problems, beginning with what to call the company after the transaction and going down into detail about what to do about overlapping and competing product brands. Decisions about what brand equity to write off are not inconsequential. And, given the ability for the right brand choices to drive preference and earn a price premium, the future success of a merger or acquisition depends on making wise brand choices. Brand decision-makers essentially can choose from four different approaches to dealing with naming issues, each with specific pros and cons:

1. Keep one name and discontinue the other. The strongest legacy brand with the best prospects for the future lives on. In the 2010 merger of United Airlines and Continental Airlines, the United name continued forward with the Continental branding while the United branding and Continental name retired.
2. Keep one name and demote the other. The strongest name becomes the company name and the weaker one is demoted to a divisional brand or product brand. An example is Caterpillar Inc. keeping the Bucyrus International name.
3. Keep both names and use them together. Some companies try to please everyone and keep the value of both brands by using them together. This can create an unwieldy name, as in the case of PricewaterhouseCoopers, which has since changed its brand name to "PwC".
4. Discard both legacy names and adopt a totally new one. The classic example is the merger of Bell Atlantic with GTE, which became Verizon Communications. Not every merger with a new name is successful. By consolidating into YRC Worldwide, the company lost the considerable value of both Yellow Freight and Roadway Corp.

The factors influencing brand decisions in a merger or acquisition transaction can range from political to tactical. Ego can drive choice just as well as rational factors such as brand value and costs involved with changing brands.

Beyond the bigger issue of what to call the company after the transaction comes the ongoing detailed choices about what divisional, product and service brands to keep. The detailed decisions about the brand portfolio are covered under the topic brand architecture.

== History ==
Most histories of M&A begin in the late 19th century United States. However, mergers coincide historically with the existence of companies. In 1708, for example, the East India Company merged with an erstwhile competitor to restore its monopoly over the Indian trade. In 1784, the Italian Monte dei Paschi and Monte Pio banks were united as the Monti Reuniti. In 1821, the Hudson's Bay Company merged with the rival North West Company.

=== The Great Merger Movement: 1895–1905 ===
The Great Merger Movement was a predominantly U.S. business phenomenon that happened from 1895 to 1905. During this time, small firms with little market share consolidated with similar firms to form large, powerful institutions that dominated their markets, such as the Standard Oil Company, which at its height controlled nearly 90% of the global oil refinery industry. It is estimated that more than 1,800 of these firms disappeared into consolidations, many of which acquired substantial shares of the markets in which they operated. The vehicle used were so-called trusts. In 1900 the value of firms acquired in mergers was 20% of GDP. In 1990 the value was only 3% and from 1998 to 2000 it was around 10–11% of GDP. Companies such as DuPont, U.S. Steel, and General Electric that merged during the Great Merger Movement were able to keep their dominance in their respective sectors through 1929, and in some cases today, due to growing technological advances of their products, patents, and brand recognition by their customers. There were also other companies that held the greatest market share in 1905 but at the same time did not have the competitive advantages of the companies like DuPont and General Electric. These companies such as International Paper and American Chicle saw their market share decrease significantly by 1929 as smaller competitors joined forces with each other and provided much more competition. The companies that merged were mass producers of homogeneous goods that could exploit the efficiencies of large volume production. In addition, many of these mergers were capital-intensive. Due to high fixed costs, when demand fell, these newly merged companies had an incentive to maintain output and reduce prices. However more often than not mergers were "quick mergers". These "quick mergers" involved mergers of companies with unrelated technology and different management. As a result, the efficiency gains associated with mergers were not present. The new and bigger company would actually face higher costs than competitors because of these technological and managerial differences. Thus, the mergers were not done to see large efficiency gains, they were in fact done because that was the trend at the time. Companies which had specific fine products, like fine writing paper, earned their profits on high margin rather than volume and took no part in the Great Merger Movement.

==== Short-run factors ====
One of the major short run factors that sparked the Great Merger Movement was the desire to keep prices high. However, high prices attracted the entry of new firms into the industry.

A major catalyst behind the Great Merger Movement was the Panic of 1893, which led to a major decline in demand for many homogeneous goods. For producers of homogeneous goods, when demand falls, these producers have more of an incentive to maintain output and cut prices, in order to spread out the high fixed costs these producers faced (i.e. lowering cost per unit) and the desire to exploit efficiencies of maximum volume production. However, during the Panic of 1893, the fall in demand led to a steep fall in prices.

Another economic model proposed by Naomi R. Lamoreaux for explaining the steep price falls is to view the involved firms acting as monopolies in their respective markets. As quasi-monopolists, firms set quantity where marginal cost equals marginal revenue and price where this quantity intersects demand. When the Panic of 1893 hit, demand fell and along with demand, the firm's marginal revenue fell as well. Given high fixed costs, the new price was below average total cost, resulting in a loss. However, also being in a high fixed costs industry, these costs can be spread out through greater production (i.e. higher quantity produced). To return to the quasi-monopoly model, in order for a firm to earn profit, firms would steal part of another firm's market share by dropping their price slightly and producing to the point where higher quantity and lower price exceeded their average total cost. As other firms joined this practice, prices began falling everywhere and a price war ensued.

One strategy to keep prices high and to maintain profitability was for producers of the same good to collude with each other and form associations, also known as cartels. These cartels were thus able to raise prices right away, sometimes more than doubling prices. However, these prices set by cartels provided only a short-term solution because cartel members would cheat on each other by setting a lower price than the price set by the cartel. Also, the high price set by the cartel would encourage new firms to enter the industry and offer competitive pricing, causing prices to fall once again. As a result, these cartels did not succeed in maintaining high prices for a period of more than a few years. The most viable solution to this problem was for firms to merge, through horizontal integration, with other top firms in the market in order to control a large market share and thus successfully set a higher price.

==== Long-run factors ====
In the long run, due to desire to keep costs low, it was advantageous for firms to merge and reduce their transportation costs thus producing and transporting from one location rather than various sites of different companies as in the past. Low transport costs, coupled with economies of scale also increased firm size by two- to fourfold during the second half of the nineteenth century. In addition, technological changes prior to the merger movement within companies increased the efficient size of plants with capital intensive assembly lines allowing for economies of scale. Thus improved technology and transportation were forerunners to the Great Merger Movement. In part due to competitors as mentioned above, and in part due to the government, however, many of these initially successful mergers were eventually dismantled. The U.S. government passed the Sherman Act in 1890, setting rules against price fixing and monopolies. Starting in the 1890s with such cases as Addyston Pipe and Steel Company v. United States, the courts attacked large companies for strategizing with others or within their own companies to maximize profits. Price fixing with competitors created a greater incentive for companies to unite and merge under one name so that they were not competitors anymore and technically not price fixing.

The economic history has been divided into Merger Waves based on the merger activities in the business world as:

Period	Name	Facet
1893–1904	First Wave	Horizontal mergers
1919–1929	Second Wave	Vertical mergers
1955–1970	Third Wave	Diversified conglomerate mergers
1974–1989	Fourth Wave	Co-generic mergers; Hostile takeovers; Corporate Raiding
1993–2000	Fifth Wave	Cross-border mergers, mega-mergers
2003–2008	Sixth Wave	Globalisation, Shareholder Activism, Private Equity, LBO
2014–	Seventh Wave	Generic/balanced, horizontal mergers of Western companies acquiring emerging market resource producers. Reverse Mergers, Spac Mergers

=== Objectives in post-1965 merger waves ===
During the third merger wave (1965–1989), corporate marriages involved more diverse companies. Acquirers more frequently bought into different industries. Sometimes this was done to smooth out cyclical bumps, to diversify, the hope being that it would hedge an investment portfolio.

Starting in the fifth merger wave (1992–1998) and continuing today, companies are more likely to acquire in the same business, or close to it, firms that complement and strengthen an acquirer's capacity to serve customers.

In recent decades however, cross-sector convergence has become more common. For example, retail companies are buying tech or e-commerce firms to acquire new markets and revenue streams. It has been reported that convergence will remain a key trend in M&A activity through 2015 and onward.

Buyers are not necessarily hungry for the target companies' hard assets. Some are more interested in acquiring thoughts, methodologies, people and relationships. Paul Graham recognized this in his 2005 essay "Hiring is Obsolete", in which he theorizes that the free market is better at identifying talent, and that traditional hiring practices do not follow the principles of free market because they depend a lot upon credentials and university degrees. Graham was probably the first to identify the trend in which large companies such as Google, Yahoo! or Microsoft were choosing to acquire startups instead of hiring new recruits, a process known as acqui-hiring.

Many companies are being bought for their patents, licenses, market share, name brand, research staff, methods, customer base, or culture.

=== Largest deals in history ===
The top ten largest deals in M&A history cumulate to a total value of 1,118,963 mil. USD. (1.118 tril. USD).

Date announced	Acquiror name	Acquiror mid-industry	Acquiror nation	Target name	Target mid-industry	Target nation	Value of transaction ($mil)
1999-11-14	Vodafone AirTouch	Wireless	United Kingdom	Mannesmann	Wireless	Germany	202,785.13
2000-01-10	America Online	Internet Software & Services	United States	Time Warner	Motion Pictures / Audio Visual	United States	164,746.86
2015-06-26	Altice	Cable	Luxembourg	Altice	Cable	Luxembourg	145,709.25
2013-09-02	Verizon Communications	Telecommunications Services	United States	Verizon Wireless	Wireless	United States	130,298.32
2007-08-29	Shareholders	Other Financials	Switzerland	Philip Morris International	Tobacco	Switzerland	107,649.95
2015-09-16	Anheuser-Busch InBev	Food and Beverage	Belgium	SABMiller	Food and Beverage	United Kingdom	101,475.79
2007-04-25	RFS Holdings	Other Financials	Netherlands	ABN-AMRO	Banks	Netherlands	98,189.19
1999-11-04	Pfizer	Pharmaceuticals	United States	Warner-Lambert	Pharmaceuticals	United States	89,167.72
2016-10-22	AT&T	Media	United States	Time Warner	Media	United States	88,400
1998-12-01	Exxon	Oil & Gas	United States	Mobil	Oil & Gas	United States	78,945.79
2022-01-18	Microsoft	Technology	United States	Blizzard Entertainment and Activision under parent company Activision Blizzard	Video games	United States	68,700

== Cross-border ==
=== Introduction ===
In a study conducted in 2000 by Lehman Brothers, it was found that, on average, large M&A deals cause the domestic currency of the target corporation to appreciate by 1% relative to the acquirer's local currency. Until 2018, around 280,472 cross-border deals have been conducted, which cumulates to a total value of almost US$24,069 billion.

The rise of globalization has exponentially increased the necessity for agencies such as the Mergers and Acquisitions International Clearing (MAIC), trust accounts and securities clearing services for Like-Kind Exchanges for cross-border M&A. On a global basis, the value of cross-border mergers and acquisitions rose seven-fold during the 1990s. In 1997 alone, there were over 2,333 cross-border transactions, worth a total of approximately $298 billion. The vast literature on empirical studies over value creation in cross-border M&A is not conclusive, but points to higher returns in cross-border M&As compared to domestic ones when the acquirer firm has the capability to exploit resources and knowledge of the target's firm and of handling challenges. In China, for example, securing regulatory approval can be complex due to an extensive group of various stakeholders at each level of government. In the United Kingdom, acquirers may face pension regulators with significant powers, in addition to an overall M&A environment that is generally more seller-friendly than the U.S. Nonetheless, the current surge in global cross-border M&A has been called the "New Era of Global Economic Discovery".

In little more than a decade, M&A deals in China increased by a factor of 20, from 69 in 2000 to more than 1,300 in 2013.

In 2014, Europe registered its highest levels of M&A deal activity since the financial crisis. Driven by U.S. and Asian acquirers, inbound M&A, at $320.6 billion, reached record highs by both deal value and deal count since 2001.

Approximately 23 percent of the 416 M&A deals announced in the U.S. M&A market in 2014 involved non-U.S. acquirers.

For 2016, market uncertainties, including Brexit and the potential reform from a U.S. presidential election, contributed to cross-border M&A activity lagging roughly 20% behind 2015 activity.

In 2017, the controverse trend which started in 2015, decreasing total value but rising total number of cross border deals, kept going. Compared on a year on year basis (2016–2017), the total number of cross border deals decreased by −4.2%, while cumulated value increased by 0.6%.

Even mergers of companies with headquarters in the same country can often be considered international in scale and require MAIC custodial services. For example, when Boeing acquired McDonnell Douglas, the two American companies had to integrate operations in dozens of countries around the world (1997). This is just as true for other apparently "single-country" mergers, such as the $29-billion merger of Swiss drug makers Sandoz and Ciba-Geigy (now Novartis).

=== In emerging countries ===
M&A practice in emerging countries differs from more mature economies, although transaction management and valuation tools (e.g. DCF, comparables) share a common basic methodology. In China, India or Brazil for example, differences affect the formation of asset price and on the structuring of deals. Profitability expectations (e.g. shorter time horizon, no terminal value due to low visibility) and risk represented by a discount rate must both be properly adjusted. In a M&A perspective, differences between emerging and more mature economies include: i) a less developed system of property rights, ii) less reliable financial information, iii) cultural differences in negotiations, and iv) a higher degree of competition for the best targets.

- Property rights: the capacity to transfer property rights and legally enforce the protection of such rights after payment may be questionable. Property transfer through the Stock Purchase Agreement can be imperfect (e.g. no real warranties) and even reversible (e.g. one of the multiple administrative authorizations needed not granted after closing) leading to situations where costly remedial actions may be necessary. When the rule of law is not established, corruption can be a rampant problem.
- Information: documentation delivered to a buyer may be scarce with a limited level of reliability. As an example, double sets of accounting are common practice and blur the capacity to form a correct judgment. Running valuation on such basis bears the risk to lead to erroneous conclusions. Therefore, building a reliable knowledge base on observable facts and on the result of focused due diligences, such as recurring profitability measured by EBITDA, is a good starting point.
- Negotiation: "Yes" may not be synonym that the parties have reached an agreement. Getting immediately to the point may not be considered appropriate in some cultures and even considered rude. The negotiations may continue to the last minute, sometimes even after the deal has been officially closed, if the seller keeps some leverage, like a minority stake, in the divested entity. Therefore, establishing a strong local business network before starting acquisitions is usually a prerequisite to get to know trustable parties to deal with and have allies.
- Competition: the race to acquire the best companies in an emerging economy can generate a high degree of competition and inflate transaction prices, as a consequence of limited available targets. This may push for poor management decisions; before investment, time is always needed to build a reliable set of information on the competitive landscape.

If not properly dealt with, these factors will likely have adverse consequences on return-on-investment (ROI) and create difficulties in day-to-day business operations. It is advisable that M&A tools designed for mature economies are not directly used in emerging markets without some adjustment. M&A teams need time to adapt and understand the key operating differences between their home environment and their new market.

== Failure ==
Despite the goal of performance improvement, results from mergers and acquisitions (M&A) are often disappointing compared with results predicted or expected with up to 70% of M&A activity failing. Numerous empirical studies show high failure rates of M&A deals. Studies are mostly focused on individual determinants. A book by Thomas Straub (2007) "Reasons for frequent failure in Mergers and Acquisitions" develops a comprehensive research framework that bridges different perspectives and promotes an understanding of factors underlying M&A performance in business research and scholarship. The study should help managers in the decision-making process. The first important step towards this objective is the development of a common frame of reference that spans conflicting theoretical assumptions from different perspectives. On this basis, a comprehensive framework is proposed with which to understand the origins of M&A performance better and address the problem of fragmentation by integrating the most important competing perspectives in respect of studies on M&A. Furthermore, according to the existing literature, relevant determinants of firm performance are derived from each dimension of the model. For the dimension strategic management, the six strategic variables: market similarity, market complementarities, production operation similarity, production operation complementarities, market power, and purchasing power were identified as having an important effect on M&A performance. For the dimension organizational behavior, the variables acquisition experience, relative size, and cultural differences were found to be important. Finally, relevant determinants of M&A performance from the financial field were acquisition premium, bidding process, and due diligence. Three different ways in order to best measure post M&A performance are recognized: synergy realization, absolute performance, and finally relative performance.

Employee turnover contributes to M&A failures. The turnover in target companies is double the turnover experienced in non-merged firms for the ten years after the merger.

M&As involving small businesses are particularly problematic and have been found to take longer and cost more than expected with organisation cultural and effective communication with employees being key determinants of success and failure.

Many M&A fail due to lack of planning or execution of the plan. An empirical research study conducted between 1988 and 2002 found that "Successful acquisitions, as defined by return on investment and time to market, are more likely to involve complex products but minimal uncertainty about whether the product is functional and whether there is an appetite in the market." But failed mergers and acquisitions are caused by "hasty purchases where information platforms between companies were incompatible and the product was not yet tested for release." A recommendation to resolve these failed mergers is to wait for the product to become established in the market and research has been completed.

Deloitte determines most companies do not do their due diligence in determining whether a M&A is the correct move due to these four reasons:

- Timing
- Cost
- Existing knowledge of the industry
- Do not see the value in due diligence

Transactions that undergo a due diligence process are more likely to be successful.

A considerable body of research suggests that many mergers fail due to human factors such as issues with trust between employees of the two organizations or trust between employees and their leaders.

Any M&A transaction, no matter the size or structure, can have a significant impact on the acquiring company. Developing and implementing a robust due diligence process can lead to a much better assessment of the risks and potential benefits of a transaction, enable the renegotiation of pricing and other key terms, and smooth the way towards a more effective integration.

M&A can hinder innovation by mismanagement or cultural differences between companies. They can also create bottlenecks when they disrupt the flow of innovation with too many company policies and procedures. Market dominant companies can also be their own demise when presented with an M&A opportunity. Complacency and lack of due diligence may cause the market dominant company to miss the value of an innovative product or service.

== See also ==
- Competition regulator
- Consolidation (business)
- Contingent value rights
- Control premium
- Divestiture
- Due diligence
- Factoring (finance)
- Fairness opinion
- Initial public offering
- List of bank mergers in the United States
- List of largest mergers and acquisitions
- Management control
- Management due diligence
- Mergers and acquisitions in United Kingdom law
- Merger control
- Merger integration
- Merger simulation
- Second request (law)
- Shakeout
- Successor company
- Swap ratio
- Transformational acquisition
- Venture capital
