= Free cash flow =

Financial accounting term

In financial accounting, free cash flow (FCF) or free cash flow to firm (FCFF) is the amount by which a business's operating cash flow exceeds its working capital needs and expenditures on fixed assets (known as capital expenditures). It is that portion of cash flow that can be extracted from a company and distributed to creditors and securities holders without causing issues in its operations. As such, it is an indicator of a company's financial flexibility and is of interest to holders of the company's equity, debt, preferred stock and convertible securities, as well as potential lenders and investors.

Free cash flow can be calculated in various ways, depending on audience and available data. A common measure is to take the earnings before interest and taxes, add depreciation and amortization, and then subtract taxes, changes in working capital and capital expenditure. Depending on the audience, a number of refinements and adjustments may also be made to try to eliminate distortions.

Free cash flow may be different from net income, as free cash flow takes into account the purchase of capital goods and changes in working capital and excludes non-cash items.

== Calculations ==
Free cash flow is a non-GAAP measure of performance. As such, there are many ways to calculate free cash flow. Below is one common method for calculating free cash flow:

Element	Source
Earnings before interest and taxes (EBIT)	Current income statement
+ Depreciation & Amortization	Current income statement
− Taxes	Current income statement
− Changes in working capital	Prior and current balance sheets: Current assets and liability accounts
− Capital expenditure (CAPEX)	Prior and current balance sheets: Property, plant and equipment accounts
= Free cash flow	

Note that the first three lines above are calculated on the standard statement of cash flows.

When net profit and tax rate applicable are given, you can also calculate it by taking:

Element	Source
Net profit	Current income statement
+ Interest expense	Current income statement
− Net capital expenditure (CAPEX)	Current income statement
− Net changes in working capital	Prior and current balance sheets: Current assets and liability accounts
− Tax shield on interest expense	Current income statement
= Free cash flow	

where

- Net capital expenditure (CAPEX) = Capex − Depreciation and amortization
- Tax shield = Net interest expense × Marginal tax rate

When Profit After Tax and Debt/Equity ratio are available:

Element	Source
Profit after tax (PAT)	Income statement
− Changes in capital expenditure × (1−d)	Balance sheets, cash flow statements
+ Depreciation and amortization × (1−d)	Prior & Current Balance Sheets
− Changes in working capital × (1−d)	Balance Sheets, Cash Flow Statements
= Free cash flow	

where d is the debt/equity ratio, e.g. for a 3:4 mix it will be 3/7.

Element	Source
Net income	Income statement
+ Depreciation and amortization	Income statement
− Changes in working capital	Prior and current balance sheets
= Cash flows from operations	Same as statement of cash flows: Section 1, from operations

Therefore,

Element	Data source
Cash flows from operations	Statement of cash flows: Section 1, from operations
− Investment in Operating Capital	Statement of cash flows: Section 2, from investment
= Levered free cash flow	

== Difference with net income ==
There are two differences between net income and free cash flow. The first is the accounting for the purchase of capital goods. Net income deducts depreciation, while the free cash flow measure uses last period's net capital purchases.

Measurement type	Component	Advantage	Disadvantage
Free cash flow	Prior period net investment spending	Spending is in current dollars	Capital investments are at the discretion of management, so spending may be sporadic.
Net income	Depreciation charge	Charges are smoothed, related to cumulative prior purchases	Allowing for typical 2% inflation per year, equipment purchased 10 years ago for $100 would now cost about $122. With 10 year straight line depreciation the old machine would have an annual depreciation of $10, but the new, identical machine would have depreciation of $12.2, or 22% more.

The second difference is that the free cash flow measurement makes adjustments for changes in net working capital, where the net income approach does not. Typically, in a growing company with a 30-day collection period for receivables, a 30-day payment period for purchases, and a weekly payroll, it will require more working capital to finance the labor and profit components embedded in the growing receivables balance.

When a company has negative sales growth, it's likely to lower its capital spending. Receivables, provided they are being timely collected, will also ratchet down. All this "deceleration" will show up as additions to free cash flow. However, over the long term, decelerating sales trends will eventually catch up.

The net free cash flow definition should also allow for cash available to pay off the company's short term debt. It should also take into account any dividends that the company means to pay.

Net free cash flow = Operation cash flow − Capital expenses to keep current level of operation − dividends − Current portion of long term debt − Depreciation

Here, capex definition should not include additional investment on new equipment. However, maintenance cost can be added.

Dividends will be the base dividend that the company intends to distribute to its share holders.

Current portion of long term debt will be the minimum debt that the company needs to pay in order to not default.

Depreciation should be taken out since this will account for future investment for replacing the current property, plant and equipment (PPE).

If the net income category includes the income from discontinued operation and extraordinary income make sure it is not part of free cash flow.

Net of all the above give free cash available to be reinvested in operations without having to take more debt.

== Alternative formula ==
FCF measures:

- Operating cash flow (OCF)
- Less expenditures necessary to maintain assets (capital expenditures or "capex"), but this does not include increase in working capital.
- Less interest charges.

In symbols:

$$FCF_t = OCB_t - I_t \,$$

where

- OCB_{t} is the firm's net operating profit after taxes (NOPAT) during period t
- I_{t} is the firm's investment during period t including variation of working capital

Investment is simply the net increase (decrease) in the firm's capital, from the end of one period to the end of the next period:

$$I_t = K_t - K_{t-1} \,$$

where K_{t} represents the firm's invested capital at the end of period t. Increases in non-cash current assets may, or may not be deducted, depending on whether they are considered to be maintaining the status quo, or to be investments for growth.

Unlevered free cash flow (i.e., cash flows before interest payments) is defined as EBITDA − CAPEX − changes in net working capital − taxes. This is the generally accepted definition. If there are mandatory repayments of debt, then some analysts utilize levered free cash flow, which is the same formula above, but less interest and mandatory principal repayments. The unlevered cash flow (UFCF) is usually used as the industry norm, because it allows for easier comparison of different companies’ cash flows. It is also preferred over the levered cash flow when conducting analyses to test the impact of different capital structures on the company.

Investment bankers compute free cash flow using the following formulae:

FCFF = After tax operating income + Noncash charges (such as D&A) − CAPEX − Working capital expenditures = Free cash flow to firm (FCFF)

FCFE = Net income + Noncash charges (such as D&A) − CAPEX − Change in non-cash working capital + Net borrowing = Free cash flow to equity (FCFE)

Or simply:

FCFE = FCFF + Net borrowing − Interest*(1−t)

Free cash flow can be broken into its expected and unexpected components when evaluating firm performance. This is useful when valuing a firm because there are always unexpected developments in a firm's performance. Being able to factor in unexpected cash flows provides a financial model.

$$FCF_t = E(FCF_t) + U(FCF_t) \,$$

Where: $E(FCF_t)= FCF_t-1 * (FCF_{t-1}/FCF_{t-3})^{1/2} \,$

== Uses ==
- Free cash flow measures the cash that a company will pay as interest and principal repayment to bondholders plus the cash that it could pay in dividends to shareholders if it wanted to. Even profitable businesses may have negative free cash flows. For example, a rapidly growing manufacturer with a positive cash conversion cycle will need to outlay cash to purchase inventory for profitable orders that it takes. The business can show a positive net income but have very negative cash flows as the cash gets stuck in the working capital cycle, namely inventory and accounts receivable.
- According to one version of the discounted cash flow valuation model, the intrinsic value of a company is the present value of all future expected free cash flows. In this case, the present value is computed by discounting the free cash flows at the company's weighted average cost of capital (WACC).
- Some investors prefer using free cash flow instead of net income to measure a company's financial performance and calculate the intrinsic value of the company, because free cash flow is more difficult to manipulate than net income. The problems with this approach are discussed in the cash flow and return of capital articles.
- The payout ratio is a metric used to evaluate the sustainability of distributions from REITs, Oil and Gas Royalty Trusts, and Income Trust. The distributions are divided by the free cash flow. Distributions may include any income, flowed-through capital gains or return of capital.

== Problems with capital expenditures ==
- The expenditures for maintenances of assets is only part of the capex reported on the Statement of Cash Flows. It must be separated from the expenditures for growth purposes. This split is not a requirement under GAAP, and is not audited. Management is free to disclose maintenance capex or not. Therefore, this input to the calculation of free cash flow may be subject to manipulation, or require estimation. Since it may be a large number, maintenance capex's uncertainty is the basis for some people's dismissal of 'free cash flow'.
- A second problem with the maintenance capex measurement is its intrinsic 'lumpiness'. By their nature, expenditures for capital assets that will last decades may be infrequent, but costly when they occur. 'Free cash flow', in turn, will be very different from year to year. No particular year will be a 'norm' that can be expected to be repeated. For companies that have stable capital expenditures, free cash flow will (over the long term) be roughly equal to earnings

== Agency costs ==
In a 1986 paper in the American Economic Review, Michael Jensen noted that free cash flows allowed firms' managers to finance projects earning low returns which, therefore, might not be funded by the equity or bond markets. Examining the US oil industry, which had earned substantial free cash flows in the 1970s and the early 1980s, he wrote that:

[the] 1984 cash flows of the ten largest oil companies were $48.5 billion, 28 percent of the total cash flows of the top 200 firms in Dun's Business Month survey. Consistent with the agency costs of free cash flow, management did not pay out the excess resources to shareholders. Instead, the industry continued to spend heavily on [exploration and development] activity even though average returns were below the cost of capital.

Jensen also noted a negative correlation between exploration announcements and the market valuation of these firms—the opposite effect to research announcements in other industries.

== See also ==
- Business valuation
- Cashflow forecast
- Discounted cash flow
- Enterprise value
- Economic value added
- Owner earnings
- Weighted average cost of capital
