= First Chicago method =

Method of Startup Valuation

The First Chicago method or venture capital method is a business valuation approach used by venture capital and private equity investors that combines elements of both a multiples-based valuation and a discounted cash flow (DCF) valuation approach.

The First Chicago method originated within First Chicago Bank's venture capital division, predecessor to Madison Dearborn Partners and GTCR, and was documented academically in 1987.

== Method ==
The First Chicago method values an investment by considering its possible outcomes over the holding period under several scenarios; see Corporate finance § Quantifying uncertainty. The method typically uses three scenarios:

- An "upside" or "best-case" scenario
- A "base-case" scenario
- A "downside" or "worst-case" scenario

Once these have been constructed, the valuation proceeds as follows.

1. For each case, a scenario-specific, internally consistent forecast of cash flows is prepared for the period leading to the investor's assumed divestment.
2. A divestment price, or terminal value, is then estimated using an exit multiple appropriate to that scenario.
3. The cash flows and exit price are then discounted using the investor’s required return, and the sum of these is the value of the business under the scenario in question.
4. Finally, each scenario value is multiplied by the probability assigned to that scenario. The estimated value of the investment is then the probability-weighted sum of the scenario values.

== Use ==
The method is used particularly in the valuation of growth companies which often do not have historical financial results that can be used for meaningful comparable company analysis. Multiplying actual financial results against a comparable valuation multiple often yields a value for the company that is objectively too low given the prospects for the business.

Often the First Chicago method may be preferable to a discounted cash flow taken alone. This is because such income-based business value assessment may lack the support generally observable in the market place. Professionally performed business appraisals go further and use a set of methods under all three approaches to business valuation.

Variations of the First Chicago method are employed in a number of markets, including the private equity secondary market where investors project outcomes for portfolios of private equity investments under various scenarios.

== See also ==
- rNPV: cash flows, as opposed to scenarios, are probability-weighted.
- Expected commercial value
- Valuation using discounted cash flows #Determine equity value
