= Added value =

Used as a measure of shareholder value in the financial analysis of shares

Added value in financial analysis of shares is to be distinguished from value added. It is used as a measure of shareholder value, calculated using the formula:

Added Value = The selling price of a product - the cost of bought-in materials and components

Added Value can also be defined as the difference between a particular product's final selling price and the direct and indirect input used in making that particular product. It can also be said to be the process of increasing the perceived value of the product in the eyes of the consumers (formally known as the value proposition).

The difference is profit for the firm and its shareholders after all the costs and taxes owed by the business have been paid for that financial year. Value added, or any related measure may help investors decide if this is a business that is worthwhile investing on, or that there are other and better opportunities (fixed deposits, debentures).

== Example ==
A jewelry business could display products in an attractive display or offer a gift wrapping service. These changes could make customers more willing to pay a higher price for products that appear to be of higher quality.

== Other consultancy measures ==
For other consultancy measures for shareholder value, see

- Economic value added
- Market value added

== Distinction from other value measures ==
In business analysis, value added usually refers to the additional value created by transforming inputs into a product or service. Corporate Finance Institute defines value added as the extra value created over and above the original value of something before it is offered to the end customer.

In shareholder-value analysis, however, the more common measures are metrics such as economic value added (EVA) and shareholder value analysis, which attempt to measure whether a company has created wealth in excess of its cost of capital. ACCA notes that economic value added is one way of measuring the increase in shareholder wealth achieved by a company.

== See also ==
- Surplus value, in Marxian economics
