= Comparable transactions =

Comparable transactions, in the context of mergers and acquisitions (M&A), is one of the conventional methods to value a company for sale. The main approach of the method is to look at similar or comparable transactions where the acquisition target has a similar business model and similar client base to the company being evaluated. The value of a business is then arrived at using a similar multiple of the company's EBITDA as demonstrated by multiples of EBITDA achieved in past, completed transactions of comparable businesses in the sector.

See valuation using multiples more generally. This approach is fundamentally different from that of DCF valuation method, which calculates intrinsic value.

== Example ==
In 2010, Providence Equity Partners acquired Virtual Radiologic Corporation, which is an online clinic that provides radiologist analysis through a virtual network. It was sold for a price of million and an enterprise value of $242 million. To evaluate a similar unsold company, we would look at what are called the transaction multiples.

One popular transaction multiple is EV/EBITDA. For Virtual Radiologic Corporation, the EBITDA at the time of the transaction was $20 million, giving an EBITDA multiple of 12.1x. A similar unsold company, which has EBITDA at $10 Million could expect to be sold for $120 million. In some market segments, the companies do not have high EBITDA, and sometimes a multiple based on revenues (EV/sales) is used instead. To get a more accurate valuation, one should look at the multiples of more than one similar deals that are relatively recent since multiples do change from year to year.
