= Minimum acceptable rate of return =

Business concept

In corporate finance, business, and engineering economics – in both industrial engineering and civil engineering – the minimum acceptable rate of return (often abbreviated MARR) is the minimum rate of return on a project a manager or company is willing to accept.

A synonym seen in many contexts is minimum attractive rate of return. The term hurdle rate (or cutoff rate) is also frequently used as a synonym, particularly in corporate finance, where the benchmark is often the cost of capital. See Corporate finance § Investment and project valuation.

MARR increases with increased risk, and given the opportunity cost of forgoing other projects. It is typically referenced in the preliminary analysis of proposed projects.

== Hurdle rate determination ==
The hurdle rate is usually determined by evaluating existing opportunities in operations expansion, rate of return for investments, and other factors deemed relevant by management. As an example, suppose a manager knows that investing in a conservative project, such as a bond investment or another project with no risk, yields a known rate of return. When analyzing a new project, the manager may use the conservative project's rate of return as the MARR. The manager will only implement the new project if its anticipated return exceeds the MARR by at least the risk premium of the new project.

A risk premium can also be attached to the hurdle rate if management feels that specific opportunities inherently contain more risk than others that could be pursued with the same resources. A common method for evaluating a hurdle rate is to apply the discounted cash flow method to the project, which is used in net present value models. The hurdle rate determines how rapidly the value of the dollar decreases out in time, which, parenthetically, is a significant factor in determining the payback period for the capital project when discounting forecast savings and spending back to present-day terms. Most companies use a 12% hurdle rate, which is based on the fact that the S&P 500 typically yields returns somewhere between 8% and 11% (annualized). Companies operating in industries with more volatile markets might use a slightly higher rate in order to offset risk and attract investors.

The hurdle rate is frequently used as a synonym of cutoff rate, benchmark and cost of capital. Different organizations might have slightly different interpretations, so when multiple organizations (e.g., a startup company and a venture capital firm) are discussing the suitability of investing in a project, it is important that both sides' understanding of the term are compatible for this purpose. The hurdle rate is always higher (usually significantly) than the cost of capital - since generally no project is undertaken by a for profit entity that does not have an expected rate of return higher than the cost of capital (i.e., a profit) and every project has risk ( which must be compensated for).

== Project analysis ==
When a project has been proposed, it must first go through a preliminary analysis in order to determine whether or not it has a positive net present value using the MARR as the discount rate. The MARR is the target rate for evaluation of the project investment. This is accomplished by creating a cash flow diagram for the project, and moving all of the transactions on that diagram to the same point, using the MARR as the interest rate. If the resulting value at that point is zero or higher, then the project will move on to the next stage of analysis. Otherwise, it is discarded. The MARR generally increases with increased risk.

== Typical values ==
The MARR is often decomposed into the sum of the following components (range of typical values shown):

- Traditional inflation-free rate of interest for risk-free loans: 3-5%
- Expected rate of inflation: 5%
- The anticipated change in the rate of inflation, if any, over the life of the investment: Usually taken at 0%
- The risk of defaulting on a loan: 0-5%
- The risk profile of a particular venture: 0-5% and higher

== See also ==
- Weighted average cost of capital
- Cost of capital
- Internal rate of return
