= Cash-flow diagram =

Visual financial tool

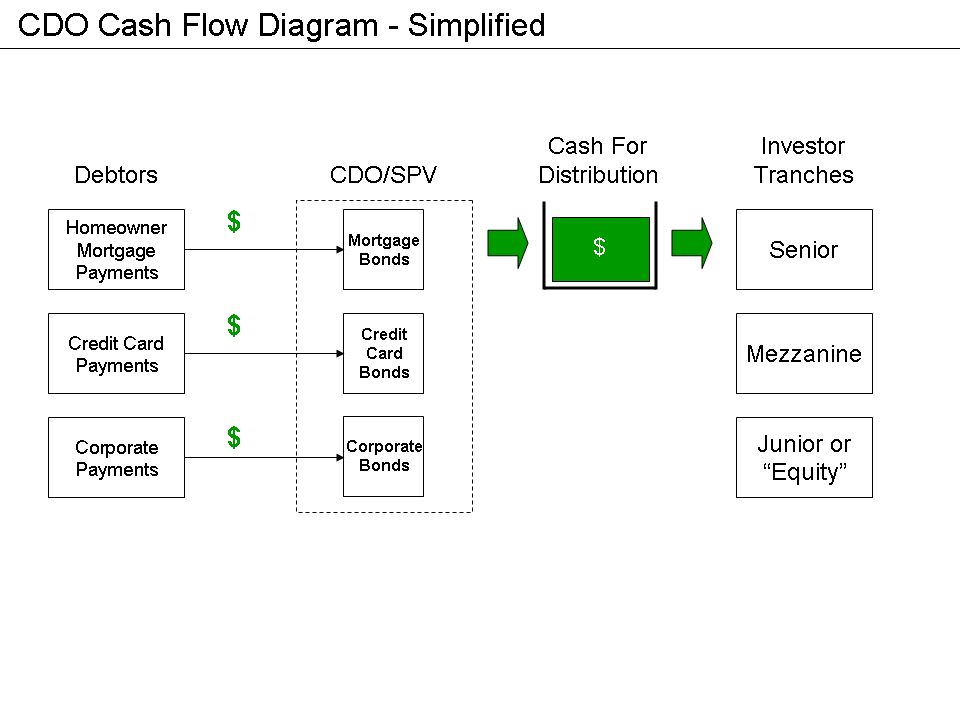
collateralized debt obligation cash-flow diagram.

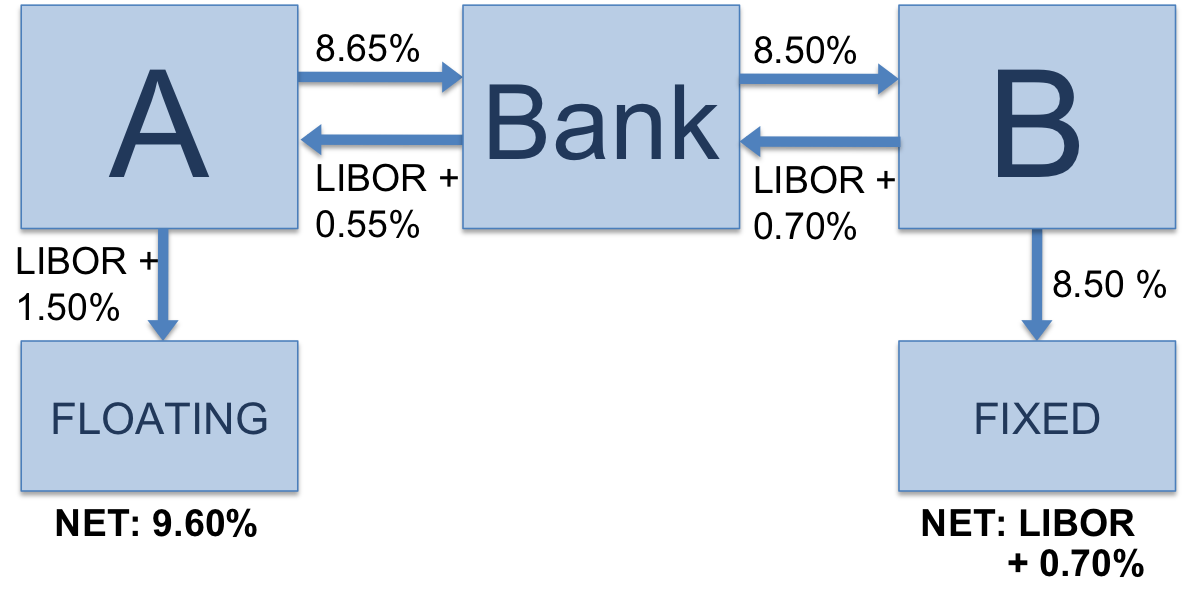
interest rate swap cash-flow diagram.

A cash-flow diagram is a financial tool used to represent the cashflows associated with a security, "project", or business.

As per the graphics, cash flow diagrams are widely used in structuring and analyzing securities, particularly swaps. They may also be used to represent payment schedules for bonds, mortgages and other types of loans.

In the context of business, and engineering economics, these are used by management accountants and engineers, to represent the cash-transactions which will take place over the course of a given project. Transactions can include initial investments, maintenance costs, projected earnings or savings resulting from the project, as well as salvage and resale value of equipment at the end of the project. These diagrams - and the associated modelling - are then used to determine a break-even point ("cash flow neutrality"), or to further, and more generally, analyze operations and profitability. See cashflow forecast and operating cash flow.

== See also ==
- Sankey diagram
- Flow diagram
