= Expected commercial value =

Prospect-weighted valuation method for assessing uncertain project outcomes

Expected commercial value (ECV), also known as estimated commercial value, is a prospect-weighted value for a "project" with unclear conclusions; it is similar to expected net existing value (ENPV). In general ECV is used as a supplementary capital budgeting technique, in that it allows an analyst to compare each project's expected value against its net present value as usually calculated, i.e. using planned and contracted costs. The company can thereby maximize the value and worth of its portfolio of projects, while working within its budget constraints.

As with ENPV, developments are defined to represent different project outcomes, with each scenario being assigned a possibility. A project value is computed for each scenario, and the expected commercial value is obtained by multiplying each situation's value by the scenario odds and adding the results. Depending on the procedures used to estimate the value of the project under each scenario, ECV can be a useful way to address project uncertainties. However, as indicated below, the technique often involves explanations that may or may not be appropriate.

Several techniques are used to estimate the probabilities and cashflows of the scenarios; often, the project may be broken down into stages which are represented in a decision tree. In reality, technical and commercial successes are not definite outcomes. There are changeable degrees of technical success and, assuming the product is launched, commercial sales could be anywhere within a variety of possibilities. Still, depending on the assertion, the simple formula may provide a satisfactory calculation. More generally, because ECV is a simplified version of ENPV, it has the limitations of the more general approach (including omission of non-financial sources of project value, and the potential for insufficient treatment of risk).

== See also ==
- rNPV
- First Chicago Method
- Penalized present value
- Valuation using discounted cash flows#Determine equity value
