= Net operating assets =

Net operating assets (NOA) are a business's operating assets minus its operating liabilities. NOA is calculated by reformatting the balance sheet so that operating activities are separated from financing activities. This is done so that the operating performance of the business can be isolated and valued independently of the financing performance. Management is usually not responsible for creating value through financing activities unless the company is in the finance industry, therefore reformatting the balance sheet allows investors to value just the operating activities and hence get a more accurate valuation of the company. One school of thought is that there is no such security as an operating liability. All liabilities are a form of invested capital, and are discretionary, so the concept of net operating assets has no basis because operating assets are not discretionary.

NOA are mathematically equivalent to the invested capital (IC), which represents the funds invested into the company that demand a financial return in the form of dividends (equity) or interests (other short and long-term debts, excluding operating liabilities such as Accounts Payable).

== Calculation - Operating Approach ==
$\mathrm{NOA} = {\mbox{operating assets}} - {\mbox{operating liabilities}} = {\mbox{invested capital}}$

To calculate NOA or the Invested capital, the balance sheet must be reformatted to separate operating activities from financing activities. Operating activities are anything that involves the day-to-day running of the business such as accounts receivable, inventory, etc.; and financing activities are any accounts that are "interest-bearing" or have financial characteristics and are not related to the regular operations such as debt and equity investments.

Operating assets

The basic equation is:

$\mbox{Operating assets} = \mbox{total assets} - \mbox{Excess cash and cash equivalents} - \mbox{Financial assets and investments}$

A distinction should be made between liquidity/buffer cash, which is required for the day-to-day operations, and excess cash, which the company does not need for its operations. This distinction is usually not visible on financial statements, thus needs to be estimated when calculating the NOA.

Financial assets are excluded, as they could be sold without disrupting the company's operations. However, controlling stakes and investments in affiliates on which the company exercises a significant influence (typically over 20% ownership) are considered as operating assets due to their strategic importance in the operation of the company.

Operating liabilities

$$\begin{aligned}
\mbox{Operating liabilities} =\;&
\mbox{Accounts Payable}\\
&+ \mbox{Accrued/deferred Operating Expenses}\\
&+ \mbox{Reserve for Operating Expenses}\\
&+ \mbox{Accrued/deferred taxes on operating profit}\\
&+ \mbox{Reserve for taxes on operating profit}
\end{aligned}$$

Note that equity is not included in liabilities. Taxes on financing profit should be excluded.

== Calculation - Financing Approach ==
Alternatively, the invested capital (and thus the NOA) can be calculating as the net amount of interest-bearing debts:

$$\begin{aligned}
\mbox{Operating assets} =\;&
\mbox{Equity}\\
&+ \mbox{Short-term and Long-term non-operating Debts}\\
&- \mbox{Financial assets and Investments}\\
&- \mbox{Excess cash and cash equivalents}
\end{aligned}$$

Operating liabilities, such as Accounts Payable, are excluded as they do not normally generate interest expenses.

== Application ==
Calculating NOA is necessary for applying the Discounted Abnormal Operating Earnings valuation model. DAOE is one of the most widely accepted valuation models because it is considered the least sensitive to forecast errors. NOA can also be used in the calculation of Free cash flow (FCF) and therefore the Discounted cash flow model. However it is not necessary to calculate FCF.

- $\mathrm{DAOE} = \frac{\mbox{NOPAT} (t) - \mbox{WACC} \times \mbox{NOA} (t - 1)}{\mbox{WACC}} + {\mbox{NOA}} - {\mbox{BVD}}$
- $\mathrm{FCF} = {\mbox{NOPAT}} - {\mbox{Change in NOA}}$
- $\mathrm{DCF} = \frac{\mbox{FCF}}{\mbox{WACC}} - {\mbox{BVD}}$

Invested capital is used in several important measurements of financial performance, including return on invested capital, economic value added, and free cash flow.

== See also ==
- Free cash flow
- Financial statement analysis
