= Forecast period (finance) =

In corporate finance, in the context of discounted cash flow valuation, the forecast period is the time period during which explicitly forecast, individual yearly cash flows are input to the valuation-formula. Cash flows after the forecast period are represented by a fixed number - the "terminal value" - determined using assumptions relating to the sustainable compound annual growth rate or exit multiple.

There are no fixed rules for determining the duration of the forecast period. However, choosing a forecast period of 10 years, for example, will not be meaningful when individual cash flows can only reasonably be modeled for four years; see Cashflow forecast. The number of forecasting years is therefore to be limited by the "meaningfulness" of the individual yearly cash flows ahead. Addressing this, there are three typical methods of determining the forecast period.

1. Based on company positioning: The forecast period corresponds to the years where an excess return is achievable. In the years chosen the company should expect to generate a return on new investments greater than its cost of capital. This will be based on its expected competitiveness, coupled with known barriers to entry. See: Porter's five forces, a well known tool for analyzing the competition of a business; and Sustainable growth rate § From a financial perspective for discussion re the economic argument here.
2. Based on exit strategy: The number of years after which an "exit" is planned. An exit can either be positive (merger, acquisition, initial public offering) or negative (bankruptcy). This method is typically used by investors in venture capital and private equity, planning a positive exit. See: Private equity § Investment timescales; Venture capital § Financing stages.
3. Based on market characteristics: Determine a forecast period by choosing a number of years based on the characteristics of the market. Companies in established and well known markets are better suited towards longer forecasting periods than those opening up a new market, or startups.

== See also ==
- Cashflow forecast
- Financial forecast
- Financial modelling
- Mid-year adjustment
- Valuation using discounted cash flows
