= Terminal value =

Terminal value can mean several things:

- Terminal value (accounting), the salvage or residual value of an asset
- Terminal value (finance), the future discounted value of all future cash flows beyond a given date
- Terminal value (philosophy), core moral beliefs
- Terminal value in Backus-Naur form, a grammar definition denoting a symbol that never appears on the left-hand side of the grammar list
- In computer science generally, character(s) that signify the end of a line
