= Payback period =

Accounting term

Payback period in capital budgeting refers to the time required to recoup the funds expended in an investment, or to reach the break-even point.

For example, a $1000 investment made at the start of year 1 which returned $500 at the end of year 1 and year 2 respectively would have a two-year payback period. Payback period is usually expressed in years. Starting from investment year by calculating Net Cash Flow for each year:

$\text{Net Cash Flow Year 1} = \text{Cash Inflow Year 1} - \text{Cash Outflow Year 1}$

Then:

$\text{Cumulative Cash Flow} = (\text{Net Cash Flow Year 1} + \text{Net Cash Flow Year 2} +\ldots + \text{Net Cash Flow Year n})$

Accumulate by year until Cumulative Cash Flow is a positive number: that year is the payback year.

== Description ==
Payback does not allow for the time value of money. Payback period intuitively measures how long something takes to "pay for itself." All else being equal, shorter payback periods are preferable to longer payback periods. Payback period is popular due to its ease of use despite the recognized limitations described below. See Cut off period.

The term is also widely used in other types of investment areas, often with respect to energy efficiency technologies, maintenance, upgrades, or other changes. For example, a compact fluorescent light bulb may be described as having a payback period of a certain number of years or operating hours, assuming certain costs. Here, the return to the investment consists of reduced operating costs.

Although primarily a financial term, the concept of a payback period is occasionally extended to other uses, such as energy payback period (the period of time over which the energy savings of a project equal the amount of energy expended since project inception); these other terms may not be standardized or widely used.

== Purpose ==
Payback period is often used as an analysis tool because it is easy to apply and easy to understand for most individuals, regardless of academic training or field of endeavor. When used carefully or to compare similar investments, it can be quite useful. As a stand-alone tool to compare an investment to "doing nothing," payback period has no explicit criteria for decision-making (except, perhaps, that the payback period should be less than infinity).

The payback period is considered a method of analysis with serious limitations and qualifications for its use, because it does not account for the time value of money, risk, financing, or other important considerations, such as the opportunity cost. Whilst the time value of money can be rectified by applying a weighted average cost of capital discount, it is generally agreed that this tool for investment decisions should not be used in isolation.

Alternative measures of "return" preferred by economists are net present value and internal rate of return. An implicit assumption in the use of payback period is that returns to the investment continue after the payback period. Payback period does not specify any required comparison to other investments or even to not making an investment.

== Construction ==
Payback period is usually expressed in years. Start by calculating Net Cash Flow for each year: Net Cash Flow Year 1 = Cash Inflow Year 1 - Cash Outflow Year 1. Then Cumulative Cash Flow = (Net Cash Flow Year 1 + Net Cash Flow Year 2 + Net Cash Flow Year 3, etc.) Accumulate by year until Cumulative Cash Flow is a positive number: that year is the payback year.

To calculate a more exact payback period: Payback Period = Amount to be Invested/Estimated Annual Net Cash Flow.

It can also be calculated using the formula:

              Payback Period = (p - n)÷p  + ny
                             = 1 + ny - n÷p    (unit:years)

Where
n_{y}= The number of years after the initial investment at which the last negative value of cumulative cash flow occurs.
n= The value of cumulative cash flow at which the last negative value of cumulative cash flow occurs.
p= The value of cash flow at which the first positive value of cumulative cash flow occurs.

This formula can only be used to calculate the soonest payback period; that is, the first period after which the investment has paid for itself. If the cumulative cash flow drops to a negative value some time after it has reached a positive value, thereby changing the payback period, this formula can't be applied. This formula ignores values that arise after the payback period has been reached.

Additional complexity arises when the cash flow changes sign several times; i.e., it contains outflows in the midst or at the end of the project lifetime. The modified payback period algorithm may be applied then.

1. The sum of all of the cash outflows is calculated.
2. The cumulative positive cash flows are determined for each period.
3. The modified payback is calculated as the moment in which the cumulative positive cash flow exceeds the total cash outflow.

== Shortcomings ==
Payback period doesn't take into consideration the time value of money and therefore may not present the true picture when it comes to evaluating cash flows of a project. This issue is addressed by using DPP, which uses discounted cash flows.

Payback also ignores the cash flows beyond the payback period. Most major capital expenditures have a long life span and continue to provide cash flows even after the payback period. Since the payback period focuses on short term profitability, a valuable project may be overlooked if the payback period is the only consideration.
