= Fernando Gomez-Bezares =

Spanish economist

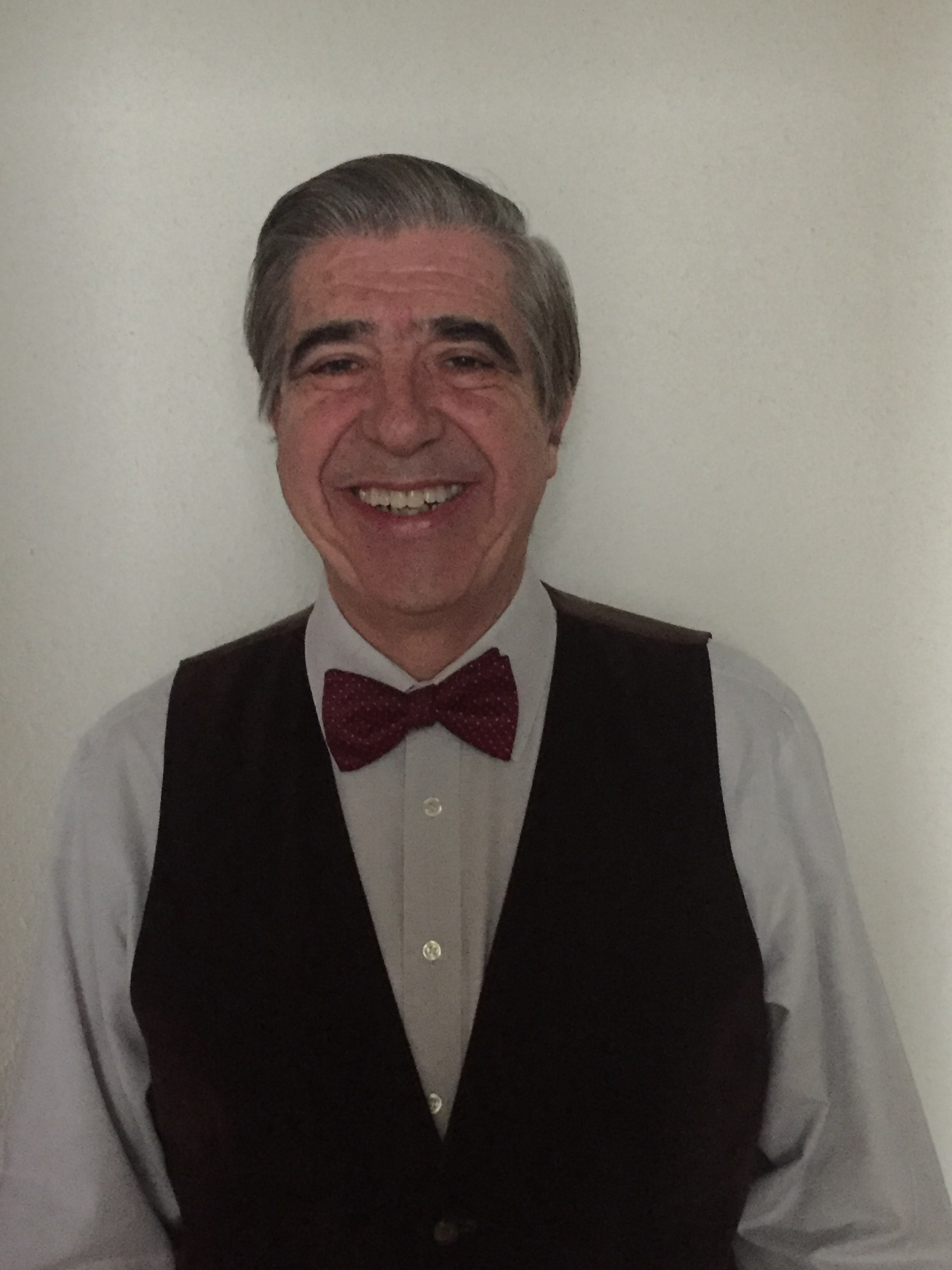
Fernando Gómez-Bezares (2018)

Fernando Gómez-Bezares (born 1956 in Logroño, La Rioja, Spain) is an economist, professor in several universities, and author of numerous publications (books, chapters and articles) in his field. In the 1980s he developed a method of selection of risky investments called Penalized present value (PPV).

== Biography ==
He studied at the Pious Schools, moving later to study at the University of Deusto, where he earned his Ph.D. in economics and business. He is a full professor at the University of Deusto in Bilbao (Spain), he has been director for more than 30 years of the finance department. He was also dean of the faculty of economics and business, vice-rector and president of the doctoral commission of the university, as well as director of several postgraduate programs. He is a visiting professor at several universities in Europe and America, having been appointed honorary professor of Universidad del Salvador in Buenos Aires (Argentina). In 2021 he was named emeritus professor of University of Deusto.

Author of 26 books and over one hundred articles on topics of his specialty, he was for forty years co-director of the "Boletín de Estudios Económicos" and he is director of the Library of Management DDB, he was co-founder and first president of the Spanish Finance Association (AEFIN).

Outside the academic world he has worked with different companies and institutions. For example he has served as a director of BBVA Asset Management and Caja Rioja, and that he has been responsible for the Strategic Plan of La Rioja, the Competitiveness Plan of La Rioja, and the Strategic Plan 2005-2020 of Rioja wine.

In recent years, he has focused his interest in Financial Ethics and Business Sustainability, having served between 2019 and 2021 as vice president of Spainsif (Spanish Sustainable Investment Forum).

== Awards ==
In 1992 he was proclaimed Figure of the Year in La Rioja and in 2008 he was awarded the Honorary Mercury Prize. In 2010, he was invested Doctor Honoris Causa by the El Salvador University in Buenos Aires (Argentina). In the "Centro Riojano Español" of this city, in 2004, he was awarded the Gold Badge of the center. On 9 November 2017, he was proclaimed "Economista Gran Reserva" and he became Honor Collegiate of the College of Economists of La Rioja (Spain); and he was also awarded the Gold Badge of the economists. He is Knight of Valvanera, he served as president of the board between 2002 and 2014. In 2017 he was proclaimed Honor President of the Knights of Valvanera.
