= Cash flow forecasting =

Process in corporate finance

Cash flow forecasting is the process of obtaining an estimate of a company's future cash levels, and its financial position more broadly. A cash flow forecast is a key financial management tool, both for large corporates, and for smaller entrepreneurial businesses. The forecast is typically based on anticipated payments and receivables. Several forecasting methodologies are available.

== Function ==
Cash flow forecasting is an element of financial management. Maintaining a company's cash flow is a central part of managing the business and the financing of ongoing operations — particularly for start-ups and small enterprises. If the business runs out of funds and is not able to obtain new finance, it will become insolvent, and be forced to declare bankruptcy.

Cash flow forecasting helps managements forecast cash levels to avoid insolvency. The frequency of forecasting is determined by several factors, such as characteristics of the business, the industry, and regulatory requirements. In a stressed situation, where insolvency is near, forecasting may be needed on a daily basis.

Key items and aspects of cash flow forecasting:

- Identifying potential shortfalls in cash balances in advance.
- Making sure that the business can afford to pay suppliers and employees.
- Spotting problems with customer payments.
- As a discipline of financial planning — the cash flow forecast is a management process, similar to preparing business budgets.
- External stakeholders, such as banks, may require a regular forecast if the business has a bank loan.

== Corporate finance ==
In the context of corporate finance, cash flow forecasting is the modeling of a company or entity's future financial liquidity over a specific timeframe: short term generally relates to working capital management, and longer term to asset and liability management.

Cash typically refers to the company's total bank balances, but often what is forecast is the treasury position, which is cash plus short-term investments minus short-term debt. Cash flow is the change in cash or treasury position from one period to the next period. The cash flow projection is an important input into valuation of assets, budgeting and determining appropriate capital structures in LBOs and leveraged recapitalizations. Depending on the organization, then, this modeling may sit with "FP&A" or with corporate treasury.

=== Methods ===
Cash flows may be forecast directly, alongside several indirect methods.

The direct method of cash flow forecasting schedules the company's cash receipts and disbursements (R&D). Receipts are primarily the collection of accounts receivable from recent sales, but may also include sales of other assets, proceeds of financing, etc. Disbursements include payroll, payment of accounts payable from recent purchases, dividends, and interest on debt. This direct R&D method is best suited to the short-term forecasting horizon of 30 days due to this being the period for which actual, as opposed to projected, data is available.

The three indirect methods are based on the company's projected income statements and balance sheets.

- The adjusted net income (ANI) method starts with operating income (EBIT or EBITDA) and adds or subtracts changes in balance sheet accounts such as receivables, payables and inventories to project cash flow.
- The pro-forma balance sheet (PBS) method directly uses the projected book cash account; if all the other balance sheet accounts have been correctly forecast, cash will be correct, also.
- The accrual reversal method (ARM), is similar to the ANI method. Here, instead of using projected balance sheet accounts, large accruals are reversed and cash effects are calculated based upon statistical distributions and algorithms. This allows the forecasting period to be weekly or even daily. It also eliminates the cumulative errors inherent in the direct, R&D method when it is extended beyond the short-term horizon. But because the ARM allocates both accrual reversals and cash effects to weeks or days, it is more complicated than the ANI or PBS indirect methods. The ARM is best suited to the medium-term forecasting horizon.

Both the ANI and PBS methods are suited to the medium-term (up to one year) and long-term (multiple years) forecasting horizons. Both are limited to the monthly or quarterly intervals of the financial plan, and need to be adjusted for the difference between accrual-accounting book cash and the often-significantly-different bank balances.

== Entrepreneurial ==
In the context of entrepreneurs or managers of small and medium enterprises, cash flow forecasting may be somewhat simpler, planning what cash will come into the business or business unit in order to ensure that outgoing can be managed so as to avoid them exceeding cashflow coming in. Entrepreneurs will be aware that "Cash is king" and, therefore, invest time and effort in cashflow forecasting.

=== Methods ===
A common approach here is to build a spreadsheet, typically in Excel, showing cash coming in from all sources out to at least 90 days, and all cash going out for the same period; any shortfall or mismatch can then be addressed, with e.g. a bridge loan or via increased collections activity. For short term cash flow forecasting there are also a number of AI driven low cost software applications available.

Applying the "spreadsheet approach" requires that the quantity and timings of receipts of cash from sales are reasonably accurate, which in turn requires judgement honed by experience of the industry concerned, because it is rare for cash receipts to match sales forecasts exactly, and it is also rare for customers all to pay on time. (These principles remain constant whether the cash flow forecasting is done on a spreadsheet or on paper or on some other IT system.) correspondingly, it is noted that when using theoretical methods in cash flow forecasting for managing a business - i.e. using financial accounting as opposed to management accounting standards - non-cash items may be included in the cashflow, skewing the result.

Forecast figures should be recorded when the cash is due to be collected or paid, not when invoices are sent or received.

== See also ==
- Cash-flow diagram
- Cash flow at risk
- Cash is king
- Financial analyst § Corporate and other
- Financial forecast
- Financial modeling § Accounting
- Forecast period (finance)
- Valuation using discounted cash flows § Determine cash flow for each forecast period
- Mid-year adjustment
- Owner earnings
- Operating budget
- Outline of finance § Financial modeling
