= Look-through earnings =

Neologism

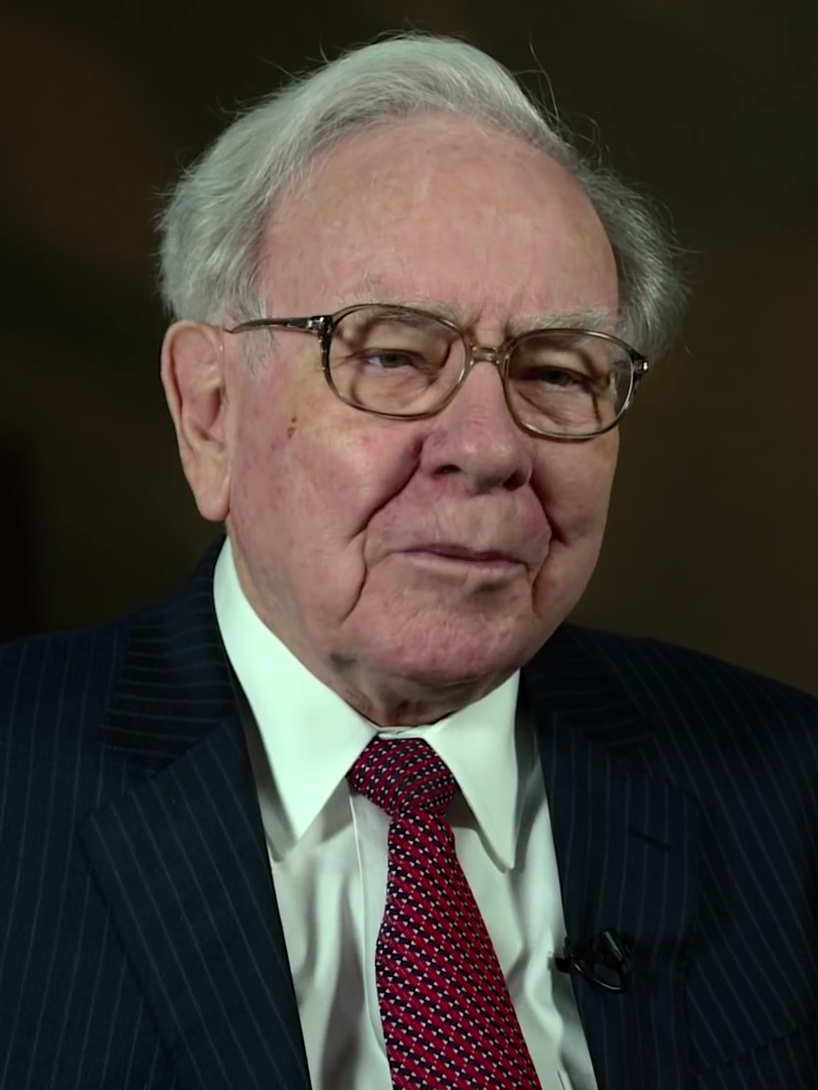
Warren Buffett at the 2015 SelectUSA Investment Summit

Look-through earnings is a term coined by the American investor Warren Buffett, who believes it to be a better metric to determine the intrinsic value of a holding company. Buffett believes look-through earnings more accurately show how a company invests its retained earnings. His preference for this concept is due to the fact that it can overcome the shortcomings of general accounting.

== History ==
The concept of look-through earnings was first mentioned in a booklet called Berkshire Hathaway's Owners Manual first published in 1996 and updated in 1999. In the booklet Buffett lays out the 13 principles he had mentioned at the time of the Blue Chip merger of 1983. The principles were mainly for new shareholders to understand Berkshire Hathaway's managerial methods.

== Mathematics ==
Individual investors can calculate look-through earnings of a given holding company by adding the retained earnings and dividend amount of a given company minus the dividend taxes.

Look-Through Earnings = (Dividends Received + Retained Earnings) - Tax on Dividends

Dividends are the cash payments distributed to investors quarterly or annually. The annual dividend amount per share can be easily calculated by multiplying the dividend yield by the per share stock price.

Retained earnings are the profits that a company retains for future investments. These earnings are normally found on the balance sheet under the shareholder's equity. To calculate retained earnings, add the beginning retained earnings to the net income or loss and then subtract all dividend payouts.

RE = Beginning Period RE + Net Income/Loss – Cash Dividends – Stock Dividends

== Read more ==
- Warren Buffett
- Price–earnings ratio
