= Valuation: Measuring and Managing the Value of Companies =

Textbook on corporate finance

- First edition (1990)
- Author: McKinsey & Company; Tim Koller; Marc Goedhart; David Wessels
- Language: English
- Series: Wiley Finance
- Subject: Valuation; corporate finance; investment management
- Publisher: John Wiley & Sons
- Publication date: August 17, 2015
- Publication place: United States
- Media type: Print; e-book
- Pages: 848 (6th edition)
- ISBN: 978-1118873700 (6th edition)

Valuation: Measuring and Managing the Value of Companies is a textbook on valuation, corporate finance, and investment management by McKinsey & Company. The book was initially published in 1990 and is now available in its eighth edition.

The book has received reviews from The Accounting Review, American Banker, The National Public Accountant, AFP Exchange, and The Journal of Finance.

== See also ==
- Investment Valuation
- Security Analysis (book)
- Shareholder value
