= Shareholder value =

Business term

Shareholder value is a business term, sometimes phrased as shareholder value maximization. The term expresses the idea that the primary goal for a business is to increase the wealth of its shareholders (owners) by paying dividends and/or causing the company's stock price to increase. It became a popular concept in business management during the 1990s and led to a management approach often called value-based management or managing for value.

== Definition ==
The term shareholder value can be used to refer to:

- The market capitalization of a company;
- The view that the primary goal for a company is to increase the wealth of its shareholders (owners) by paying dividends and/or causing the stock price to increase (i.e. the Friedman doctrine articulated in 1970);
- The more specific concept that planned actions by management and the returns to shareholders should outperform certain benchmarks such as the cost of capital concept. In essence, the idea that shareholders' money should be used to earn a higher return than they could earn themselves by investing in other assets having the same amount of risk. The term in this sense was emphasized by Alfred Rappaport in 1986.

For a publicly traded company, shareholder value is the part of its capitalization which is equity as opposed to long-term debt. In the case of only one type of stock, this would roughly be the number of outstanding shares times current shareprice. Things like dividends augment shareholder value while issuing of shares (stock options) lower it. This shareholder value added should be compared to average/required increase in value, making reference to the organizations cost of capital.

For a privately held company, the value of the firm after debt must be estimated using one of several valuation methods, such as discounted cash flow.

== History ==
The concept of measuring business performance as profit less an opportunity cost charge for the use of the funds employed in earning the profit dates back to Robert Hamilton who published An Introduction to Merchandize in 1777 in Edinburgh, Scotland. Hamilton's treatment may have its origins in Adam Smith's, The Wealth of Nations (first edition in 1776). The roots of shareholder value theory can thus be traced to the late 18th century when the capital investment required to finance new manufacturing businesses during the Industrial Revolution in the United Kingdom led to a change in the structure of businesses, from traditional small family-run businesses to large publicly owned companies with dispersed shareholders and professional managers. This change in governance, called managerialism, led to new modes of coordinating enterprise, technology and planning.

In the United States, Alfred Marshall, in Principles of Economics, explained in 1890 that for firms to create wealth they must earn more than the cost of their debt and equity. General Motors applied the concept in the 1920s. (Note: The DuPont company began using DuPont analysis in the 1920s.) It was called excess earnings by Canning (1929) and Preinreich (1938). (Note: During the first half of the 20th century, debates took place in the United States and in the United Kingdom about how to evaluate investment decisions from a theoretical and commercial perspective. This led to Paul Samuelson's discounted utility model in 1937, based on a single discount rate compounded across time periods.) In the 1950's General Electric labeled it residual income and applied it as a performance measure to their decentralized divisions. Fortune magazine published an article in 1962 by the management of a US textile company, Indian Head Mills, that articulated shareholder wealth creation as the paramount interest of the management of a company:

The objective of our company is to increase the intrinsic value of our common stock. We are not in business to grow bigger for the sake of size, not to become more diversified, not to make the most or best of anything, not to provide jobs, have the most modern plants, the happiest customers, lead in new product development, or to achieve any other status which has no relation to the economic use of capital. Any or all of these may be, from time to time, a means to our objective, but means and ends must never be confused. We are in business solely to improve the inherent value of the common stockholders' equity in the company.

In Divisional Performance: Measurement and Control (1965), David Solomons suggested that residual income be used as an internal performance measure and Robert Anthony (1973) suggested that it be an external performance measure. Economist Milton Friedman introduced the Friedman doctrine in a 1970 essay for The New York Times, entitled A Friedman Doctrine: The Social Responsibility of Business Is to Increase Its Profits. In it, he argued that a company has no social responsibility to the public or society; its only responsibility is to its shareholders. The Friedman doctrine was amplified after the publication of an influential 1976 business paper by finance professors Michael C. Jensen and William Meckling, Theory of the Firm: Managerial Behavior, Agency Costs and Ownership Structure, which provided a quantitative economic rationale for maximizing shareholder value.

Jack Welch, CEO of General Electric, made a speech in 1981 entitled Growing Fast in a Slow-Growth Economy, which is often acknowledged as the "dawn of the shareholder-value movement". Welch did not mention the term shareholder value, but outlined his beliefs in selling underperforming businesses and cutting costs to increase profits faster than global economic growth. In the United Kingdom in 1983, Brian Pitman became CEO of Lloyds Bank and sought to clarify the governing objective for the company. The following year, he set return on equity as the key measure of financial performance and set a target for every business within the bank to achieve a return that exceeded its cost of equity.

In Creating Shareholder Value: The New Standard for Business Performance, published in 1986, Alfred Rappaport argued that "the ultimate test of corporate strategy, indeed the only reliable measure, is whether it creates economic value for shareholders". During the late 1980s, the management consulting firm Stern Stewart & Co revised the computation of residual income with a large number of accounting adjustments; the firm named this concept Economic Value Added (EVA) and trademarked it in 1989. The consulting firms Stern Stewart, Marakon Associates, and Alcar pioneered value-based management (VBM) based on the academic work of - respectively - Joel Stern, Bill Alberts, and Alfred Rappaport. Value-based management became prominent during the 1990s, and other management consulting firms including McKinsey and BCG developed VBM approaches.

In 2009, Welch criticized parts of the application of this concept, saying he never meant to suggest boosting a company's share price should be the main goal of executives. He said managers and investors should not set share price increases as their overarching goal. He added that short-term profits should be allied with an increase in the long-term value of a company. "On the face of it, shareholder value is the dumbest idea in the world," he said. "Shareholder value is a result, not a strategy . . . Your main constituencies are your employees, your customers and your products." Welch later elaborated on this, clarifying that "my point is, increasing the value of your company in both the short and long term is an outcome of the implementation of successful strategies."

=== Interpretation ===
During the 1970s, there was an economic crisis caused by stagflation. The stock market had been flat for nearly 12 years and inflation levels had reached double-digits. The Japanese had taken the top spot as the dominant force in auto and high technology manufacturing, a title historically held by American companies. This, coupled with the economic changes noted by Mark Mizruchi and Howard Kimeldorf, brought about the question as to how to fix the current model of management. Though there were contending solutions to resolve these problems (e.g.Theodore Levitt's focus on customer value creation and R. Edward Feeman's stakeholder management framework), the winner was the Agency Theory developed by Jensen and Meckling.

Mizruchi and Kimeldorf offer an explanation of the rise in prominence of institutional investors and securities analysts as a function of the changing political economy throughout the late 20th century. The crux of their argument is based upon one main idea. The rise in prominence of institutional investors can be credited to three significant forces, namely organized labor, the state and the banks. The roles of these three forces shifted, or were abdicated, in an effort to keep corporate abuse in check. However, "without the internal discipline provided by the banks and external discipline provided by the state and labor, the corporate world has been left to the professionals who have the ability to manipulate the vital information about corporate performance on which investors depend". This allowed institutional investors and securities analysts from the outside to manipulate information for their own benefit rather than for that of the corporation as a whole.

Though Ashan and Kimeldorf (1990) admit that their analysis of what historically led to the shareholder value model is speculative, their work is well regarded and is built upon the works of some of the premier scholars in the field, namely Frank Dobbin and Dirk Zorn.

As a result of the political and economic changes of the late 20th century, the balance of power in the economy began to shift. Today, "...power depends on the capacity of one group of business experts to alter the incentives of another, and on the capacity of one group to define the interests of another". As stated earlier, what made the shift to the shareholder value model unique was the ability of those outside the firm to influence the perceived interests of corporate managers and shareholders.

However, Dobbin and Zorn argue that those outside the firm were not operating with malicious intentions. "They conned themselves first and foremost. Takeover specialists convinced themselves that they were ousting inept CEOs. Institutional investors convinced themselves that CEOs should be paid for performance. Analysts convinced themselves that forecasts were a better metric for judging stock price than current profits". Overall, it was the political and economic landscape of the time that offered the perfect opportunity for professionals outside of firms to gain power and exert their influence in order to drastically change corporate strategy.

The conflation of shareholder value maximization with profit maximization has been criticized by some economists and legal scholars. For example, Oliver Hart and Luigi Zingales argue that corporate directors have a duty to maximize the welfare of shareholders, broadly construed, not just their financial interests. Many shareholders are prosocial, and maximizing shareholder value may sometimes mean making business decisions that prioritize the social issues that investors care about, even at the expense of profits. Likewise, Lynn A. Stout writes that shareholder value is not a singular objective, because "different shareholders have different values. Some are long-term investors planning to hold stock for years or decades; others are short-term speculators."

== Agency theory and shareholder value ==
Agency theory is the study of problems characterized by disconnects between two cooperating parties: a principal and an agent. Agency problems arise in situations where there is a division of labor, a physical or temporal disconnect separating the two parties, or when the principal hires an agent for specialized expertise. In these circumstances, the principal takes on the agent to delegate responsibility to him. Theorists have described the problem as one of "separation and control": agents cannot be monitored perfectly by the principal, so they may shirk their responsibilities or act out of sync with the principal's goals. The information gap and the misalignment of goals between the two parties results in agency costs, which are the sum of the costs to the principal of monitoring, the costs to the agent of bonding with the principal, and the residual loss due to the disconnect between the principal's interests and agent's decisions.

Lastly, the shareholder value theory seeks to reform the governance of publicly owned firms in order to decrease the principal-agent information gap. The model calls for firms' boards to be independent from their corporate executives, specifically, for the head of the board to be someone other than the CEO and for the board to be independently chosen. An independent board can best objectively monitor CEO undertakings and risk. Shareholder value also argues in favor of increased financial transparency. By making firms' finances available to scrutiny, shareholders become more aware of the agent's behavior and can make informed choices about with whom to invest.

== Value-based management ==
As a management principle, value-based management (VBM), or managing for value (MFV), states that management should first and foremost consider the interests of shareholders when making management decisions. Under this principle, senior executives should set performance targets in terms of delivering shareholder returns (stock price and dividends payments) and managing to achieve them. Studies have found that VBM relates to higher firm performance and better decision making.

The concept of maximizing shareholder value is usually highlighted in opposition to alleged examples of CEO's and other management actions which enrich themselves at the expense of shareholders. Examples of this include acquisitions which are dilutive to shareholders, that is, they may cause the combined company to have twice the profits for example but these might have to be split amongst three times the shareholders. Although the legal premise of a publicly traded company is that the executives are obligated to maximize the company's profit, this does not imply that executives are legally obligated to maximize shareholder value.

As shareholder value is difficult to influence directly by any manager, it is usually broken down in components, so called value drivers. A widely used model comprises 7 drivers of shareholder value, giving some guidance to managers:

- Revenue
- Operating Margin
- Cash Tax Rate
- Incremental Capital Expenditure
- Investment in Working Capital
- Cost of Capital
- Competitive Advantage Period

Looking at some of these elements also makes it clear that short term profit maximization does not necessarily increase shareholder value. Most notably, the competitive advantage period takes care of this: if a business sells sub-standard products to reduce cost and make a quick profit, it damages its reputation and therefore destroys competitive advantage in the future. The same holds true for businesses that neglect research or investment in motivated and well-trained employees. Shareholders, analysts and the media will usually find out about these issues and therefore reduce the price they are prepared to pay for shares of this business. This more detailed concept therefore gets rid of some of the issues (though not all of them) typically associated with criticism of the shareholder value model.

Based on these seven components, all functions of a business plan and show how they influence shareholder value. A prominent tool for any department or function to prove its value are so called shareholder value maps that link their activities to one or several of these seven components. So, one can find "HR shareholder value maps", "R&D shareholder value maps", and so on.

== Criticism ==
The sole concentration on shareholder value has been widely criticized, particularly after the 2008 financial crisis. While a focus on shareholder value can benefit the owners of a corporation financially, it does not provide a clear measure of social issues like employment, environmental issues, or ethical business practices. A management decision can maximize shareholder value while lowering the welfare of third parties. Shareholder value coupled with short-termism has also been criticized as lowering the overall rate of economic growth due to reduced business capital accumulation.

It can also disadvantage other stakeholders such as customers. For example, a company may, in the interests of enhancing shareholder value, cease to provide support for old, or even relatively new, products.

Additionally, short term focus on shareholder value can be detrimental to long term shareholder value; the expense of gimmicks that briefly boost a stocks value can have negative impacts on its long term value. Marc Benioff, CEO of Salesforce, said that "[...] the obsession with maximizing profits for shareholders has brought us: terrible economic, racial and health inequalities; the catastrophe of climate change." According to critics, oversimplifying the corporation's role has neglected the imperfect world we live in.

=== Criticism for worker devaluation ===
==== Compensation packages ====
Within the 80's and 90's, numerous companies faced lawsuits from current and former employees alike for reducing or withholding workers from accessing benefits in the present or during retirement. The SV model has led to reduced pension support as a means of maximizing profits at the cost of the employees. Some companies have switched matching pension plans monthly to once a year. Critics remain alarmed at the nature of cutting out or underestimating the value of the labor a worker produces for maintaining or raising the value of stock. The reduced benefits are attributed to the trend of the corporate world's reduction in investing in non-shareholder constituents because it is not an immediate money producer—the main goal of SV theory.

==== Layoff practices ====
The aforementioned status of workers faces criticism when looking at how this "reduced pension matching" loophole becomes manipulated. If laid off before the pre-pension matching period is complete, there is no compensation. Furthermore, mass layoffs have affected companies in the home headquarters with many jobs either going overseas or being hired out to contractors from similar positions to those that were laid off for lower benefits and protections as critics and experts have noted. According to economic experts and critics alike, the downsize-and-distribute model invoked by SV theory extracts value and then further ingrains employee instability and greater income inequality.

=== Company criticisms ===
==== End of corporate responsibility ====
In Milton Friedman's seminal piece advocating for shareholder value titled "The Social Responsibility of Business Is to Increase Its Profits", he makes the argument that the business of business is its business. Friedman's postulation suggests that if social responsibility and profit run counterintuitively, pick the latter. By prioritizing the accumulation of wealth by all means, it uncomplicates other responsibilities that may have a hindrance to achieving this goal. Some responsibilities include, but are not limited to: community development, employee investment, worker benefits, research and development, and more. These responsibilities are attributed to being long-term and do not immediately satisfy the short-term – and mainstream – interpretation of shareholder value.

==== Stock buyback ====
Stock buyback is criticized for its extractive nature which takes profit and uses it to make stocks look more profitable than they might be in the name of shareholder value. In 1982, the U.S. Securities and Exchange Commission (SEC) implemented Rule 10b-18 of the Securities Exchange Act, thus allowing for corporations to buy back stock under certain thresholds and circumstances. With low investigation and consequence rates for breaches, as well as loopholes, this opened up opportunity to legal stock price manipulation. With SV theory incentivizing the shareholder and tying executive pay, the stock price became intrinsically tied with success as critics note. One notable effect of this practice includes reduced investment. From 2003 to 2012, of the 449 firms in the S&P 500, 54% of earnings went to stock buyback and 37% to dividends. This leaves 9% of earnings to go elsewhere, a reduction from the previous rates of investment in past decades. Economists like Lenore Palladino point out the eventual consequence when this bubble will burst, the majority of Americans will face the consequence, not the ones leading the firms.

=== Anthropological criticisms ===
==== Under-emphasis of corporate entity ====
Peter Drucker, author of "The Concept of the Corporation", makes the argument that shareholder value in fact serves to underplay the important social role which corporations occupy in contemporary society. Drucker states "In the social reality of today, shareholders are but one of several groups of people who stand in a special relationship to the corporation. The corporation is permanent, the share-holder is transitory. It might even be said without much exaggeration that the corporation is really socially and politically a priori, whereas the share-holder's position is derivative and exists only in contemplation of law". Drucker's argument is expanded upon by anthropologist Karen Ho, who notes that in the immediate period following the second world war, the corporation existed primarily as a social institution which largely accepted its responsibilities to those involved in its operations outside of shareholders, concerning itself with the longevity and well-being of the corporation as an institution even if this meant undertaking actions that may run counter to the immediate concerns of the corporation's shareholders. This post-war outlook is contrasted by the attitude adopted by management of modern-day corporations, which according to former WebTV CEO Randy Komisar see themselves not as institutional stewards but rather as investors themselves. Critics such as Ho believe that the shift of management attitude towards treating corporations as investments has led to the decline of the corporation as a social entity, and allows corporate management to make decisions that may be against the interests of the corporation's social stakeholders or even longevity of the corporation itself.

=== Economic criticisms ===
==== Failure of accurate modelling within neoclassical economics ====
The failure of the corporation to readily fit within the neo-classical economic model which dominates contemporary economics academia and policy is a frequently-targeted flaw by critics. Anthropologist Karen Ho argues that the concept of shareholders and subsequently shareholder value was developed primarily for the purpose of shoehorning the insertion of the corporation into the neoclassical economic model, and ignores that the neoclassical model, which was originally created in eighteenth and nineteenth century prior to the proliferation of corporate organization, was never designed to operate with number of inputs the modern corporation requires. Ho claims that advocates of neoclassical proprietorship ran directly counter to the limited-input "owner and property" intentions of influential founding figures of neoclassical economics such as Adam Smith, and that the neoclassical economic model hinges on the idea of the owner-entrepreneur being directly involved in the management and operation of their enterprise. As the modern shareholder typically has very limited or no connection to the regular operations of a corporation they have invested in, the shareholder does not fit within the owner-entrepreneur role required by the neoclassical economic model. Adam Smith himself noted his belief that managed corporations were not viable due to this issue, stating "The directors of [joint stock] companies, however, being the managers rather of other people's money than of their own, it cannot well be expected that they should watch over it with the same anxious vigilance with which the partners in a private copartnery frequently watch over their own". Critics such as Ho and Smith believe that failure of the shareholder model to accurately represent the key neoclassical owner-entrepreneur concept is a foundational issue of the neoclassical economic model, leading to an inaccurate assumption that corporate interest remained identical to shareholder interest.

=== Legal criticisms ===
A common critique of shareholder value is the mystification surrounding its legal validity. It is often espoused that shareholders are the owners. This status as a shareholder comes with an assumed legal claim of all profits after contractual obligations have been fulfilled and that they have the ability to decide the structure of the corporation on the board level however they want. Yet, none of these are rooted in any law because shareholder value is ultimately a management decision, not a legal requirement. Corporations are their own legal entity and shareholders simply hold shares, making them equal stakeholders to employees, suppliers, and more. They only get guaranteed full access to residual funds in the case of liquidation. Otherwise, the firm has all control of how to do things as they please like investing into the company, raising salaries, etc. And when it comes to the shareholder supremacy over structure, the ability is flimsy and hard to use. The few cases in which legal action can be taken is when a director is explicitly stealing. In spite of the reality of shareholder obligation and abilities, corporate America has convinced itself, according to legal critiques, that there is a legal duty to their shareholders.

== Disadvantages of the shareholder value model ==
Shareholder value may be detrimental to a company's worth. When all of a company's focus and strategy is concentrated on increasing share prices, the practice and ethics of the firm can become lost because of the following problems with the shareholder value model.

=== Increased risk ===
In the shareholder value model, companies often take on much more risk than they otherwise would. The acquisition of debt makes the company unstable and at risk of bankruptcy. Plentiful debt is conducive to increasing share value because the company has greater potential to increase value when starting at a lower baseline. This however is a detrimental to the stability of the company.

==== Debt financing ====
Debt financing, or the purposeful acquisition of debt, causes the debt to equity ratio of the company to rise. Without shareholder value, this would normally be considered negative because it means that the company is not making money. In the shareholder value system, high debt to equity ratios are considered an indicator that the company has confidence to make money in the future. Therefore, debt is not something to avoid but rather something to embrace and having debt will actually gain the company investors. Taking on large risk attracts investors and increases potential value gain, but puts the company in danger of bankruptcy and collapse.

=== Executive compensation ===
In order to facilitate an incentive structure that supports shareholder value, the method of executive compensation has changed toward making a large portion of C-suite pay come from stock. The reasoning behind this decision was that it would bring the interests of CEOs in line with those of shareholders. As a result of this decision, executive compensation has skyrocketed, quadrupling from the rate of compensation in the early 1970s. This change has also shifted the motivations of C-suite managers in the direction of increasing share price over everything else, leaving other goals like long-term growth and stakeholders like employees and customers behind. Share repurchasing might cause misaligned incentives between market capitalization and executive compensation connected to share price due to the change in number of shares.

=== Short-term strategy ===
The short-term nature of shareholder value theory is one of the features focused on by critics. They argue that this fixation on the short term leads to neglect of more profitable long-term strategies. In this way, shareholder value fails to attain the level of overall capital growth that might otherwise be expected. Given the emphasis on stock price inherent to shareholder value, incentives are created for corporations to inflate their stock price before its value becomes critical for assessment. One such incentive is that the compensation of executives and managers is increasingly tied to stock value through executive bonuses and stock options. Corporations use several gimmicks to increase stock price, perhaps the most infamous being the mass layoffs of employees which creates the appealing image of increased efficiency and lower operating costs, in turn driving up stock price. However, this and other such gimmicks have several negative consequences. Oftentimes, in the wake of mass layoffs, corporations have to refill some of the positions now vacant. This leads to a longer term inefficiency as new employees must be trained and the resources invested into the original employee (provided they were not rehired) are permanently lost.

A related criticism of shareholder value is the reliance on the process of assessing stock, which is itself vulnerable to manipulation and speculation. Speculating on the firm's stock price is in the interest of managers that receive stock compensation and may therefore cause them to focus on speculating on the stock price rather than maximizing real production.

Management experts also cite another criticism of shareholder value's short-term view, namely that it creates a corporate culture more concerned with maximizing revenue than with maintaining relationships with employees, customers, or their surrounding communities.

=== Loss of growth and productivity ===
Business experts have criticized shareholder value for failing to materialize economic growth and increased productivity. Despite decades of research and dozens of studies, there is negligible evidence that shareholder value theory has produced better results for businesses (studies that did provide evidence of shareholder value being beneficial generally were not able to be replicated; Stout). Since the inception and widespread application of shareholder value theory, returns on invested capital have steadily decreased. One explanation for this trend is reduced investment in innovation. Studies have shown that publicly traded companies (who have a share price) invest about half as much as privately held companies in the United States. Even shareholders have had disappointing results with poor returns on investment and a reduction in the population of publicly traded companies by 40%.

In addition to reduced growth, critics also point to reduced productivity. Shareholder value can have a negative effect on employee morale as the entire mission of the corporation becomes the generation of wealth for shareholders. Because of this reduction of motivation, corporations need to engage in more top-down and control-oriented management strategies, one such example being the massive rise in the use of non-compete agreements. Despite such efforts (or because of them), low employee morale has negative effects on business. Less motivated employees are less energetic and produce less and are less likely to innovate.

A further inefficiency of shareholder value is the growth of financialization. The financial industry has ballooned in size following the use of shareholder value, largely due to the outsized importance placed upon shareholders by corporations. The large financial sector is a drain on the entire United States economy, costing roughly 300 billion dollars per year. This is because the financial sector does not engage in actual production.

== Alternatives ==
While shareholder value is the most common framework for measuring a company's success and financial viability, a number of alternatives have been proposed. Indeed, maximizing shareholder value is not always the goal of successful companies.

=== Customer value creation ===
In this school of thought, the purpose of a business is to create and keep customers.

=== Stakeholder management ===
The broad idea of "stakeholders" is the most common basis of alternative frameworks. The intrinsic or extrinsic worth of a business measured by a combination of financial success, usefulness to society, and satisfaction of employees, the priorities determined by the makeup of the individuals and entities that together own the shares and direct the company. This is sometimes referred to as stakeholder value. Stakeholder value heavily relies on corporate social responsibility and long-term financial stability as a core business strategy. Academic Pete Thomas outlines one response which sees the idea of stakeholder management as "a dangerous and illegitimate challenge to shareholder interests".

The stakeholder value model is prevalent in regions where limited liability laws are not strong. Some companies, choosing to prioritize social responsibility, elect to prioritize the social and financial welfare of employees and suppliers over shareholders; this, in turn, shields shareholders, the owners of the company, from liability when the law would not be lenient should the company engage in poor behavior.

Despite its high potential social benefit, this concept is difficult to implement in practice because of the difficulty of determining equivalent measures for usefulness to society and satisfaction of employees. For instance, how much additional "usefulness to society" should shareholders expect if they were to give up $100 million in shareholder return? In response to this criticism, defenders of the stakeholder value concept argue that employee satisfaction and usefulness to society will ultimately translate into shareholder value.

Another related criticism is that it is difficult to determine how to equitably distribute value to stakeholders. The question of "who deserves what and how much" is a difficult one to answer.

=== Social enterprise ===
A company may choose to disregard shareholders completely. A social enterprise instead focuses its objectives on goals other than the profitability of its owners; indeed, the constitution of a social enterprise often precludes issuing dividends to shareholders. Social enterprises require significant investment in financial stability and long-term profitability, in the meantime taking very little risk.

Social enterprises manifest themselves in the UK as community interest companies or limited by guarantee. In the United States, California allows companies to incorporate as flexible purpose corporations.

== See also ==
- Adjusted present value
- Berle-Dodd debate
- Enterprise value
- Financial statements
- Flows to equity
- Internal rate of return
- Market value added
- Net present value
- Sustainability measurement
- Time Value of Money
- Valuation using discounted cash flows
