= Cash flow sign convention =

The cash flow sign convention is that money you pay out has a minus sign, while money you take in has a plus sign (or no sign).

- Most financial calculators (and spreadsheets) follow the Cash Flow Sign Convention. This is simply a way of keeping the direction of the cash flow straight. Cash inflows are entered as positive numbers and cash outflows are entered as negative numbers.

== Use in financial calculations ==
The cash flow sign convention is widely used in time value of money calculations and investment analysis. Under this convention, cash inflows are recorded as positive values and cash outflows as negative values, allowing formulas and financial calculators to distinguish between money received and money paid.

The convention is particularly important in calculations such as net present value, internal rate of return, and loan amortization, where the direction of the cash flow determines the mathematical result. Engineering economy texts describe cash receipts as positive and cash disbursements as negative in order to maintain consistency across financial evaluations.

== See also ==
- Cash flow
