= Discounted payback period =

Time to recoup an investment

The discounted payback period (DPB) is the amount of time that it takes (in years) for the initial cost of a project to equal to the discounted value of expected cash flows, or the time it takes to break even from an investment. It is the period in which the cumulative net present value of a project equals zero.

== Calculation ==
Cumulative discounted cash flows will start with a negative value due to the original cost of investment, but as cash is generated each year after the original investment the discounted cash flows for those years will be positive, and the cumulative discounted cash flows will progress in a positive direction towards zero. When the negative cumulative discounted cash flows become positive, or recover, DPB occurs.

Discounted payback period is calculated by the formula:

DPB = Year before DPB occurs + Cumulative Discounted Cash flow in year before recovery ÷ Discounted cash flow in year after recovery

== Advantages ==
Discounted payback period helps businesses reject or accept projects by helping determine their profitability while taking into account the time-value of money. This is done via the decision rule: If the DPB is less than its useful life, or any predetermined period, the project can be accepted. If the DPB is greater than the specified period or the project's useful life, the project should be rejected. The DPB also helps compare mutually exclusive projects, as the project with the shorter DPB should be accepted.

== Disadvantages ==
The discounted payback method still does not offer concrete decision criteria to determine if an investment increases a firm's value. In order to calculate DPB, an estimate of the cost of capital is required. Another disadvantage is that cash flows beyond the discounted payback period are ignored entirely with this method.

== See also ==
- Payback period
