= Intrinsic value (finance) =

Value calculated on simplified assumptions

In finance, the intrinsic value of an asset or security is its value as calculated with regard to an inherent, objective measure. As a distinction, the asset's price is determined relative to other similar assets. The intrinsic approach to valuation may be somewhat simplified, in that it ignores elements other than the measure in question.

== Options ==
For an option, the intrinsic value is the absolute value of the difference between the current price (S) of the underlying and the strike price (K) of the option, to the extent that this is in favor of the option holder. Thus, the option is said to have intrinsic value if the option is in-the-money; when out-of-the-money, its intrinsic value is zero. For an option, then, the intrinsic value is the same as the "immediate value" or the "current value" of the contract, which is the profit that could be gained by exercising the option immediately. Formulaically:

$$IV_{\textrm{out-of-the-money}}= 0$$
$$IV_{\textrm{in-the-money}}=\left \vert S-K \right \vert = \left \vert K-S \right \vert$$

For example, if the strike price for a call option is USD 1.00 and the price of the underlying is US$1.20, then the option has an intrinsic value of US$0.20. This is because that call option allows the owner to buy the underlying stock at a price of 1.00, which they could then sell at its current market value of 1.20. Since this gives them a profit of 0.20, that is the current ("intrinsic") value of the option.

The market price of an option is generally different from this intrinsic value, due to uncertainty: as alluded to, it is based on the current market value of the underlying instrument, but ignores the possibility of future fluctuations. Further, options are valid for a duration of time, so investors may buy or sell options contracts on their belief in the likelihood that the value of the stock will change before the option's expiration date. This is called the option time value. For example, while an out-of-the-money option has an immediate/intrinsic value of zero, since exercising the option would not be profitable at the current time, the option could still be sold at nonzero price to an investor who speculates that the option might become in-the-money before it expires, due to a change in the value in the underlying stock.

This describes what happened in one GameStop options trade that became famous: a trader spent $53,000 buying a large number of call options that were extremely cheap, since they were so far out-of-the-money that other traders thought it was very unlikely that they would ever hold intrinsic value. However, these options had an expiration date far in the future, and two years later the underlying GameStop shares spiked in value, putting the options in-the-money, which the trader was able to exercise for $48 million.

== Equity ==
In valuing equity, securities analysts may use fundamental analysis—as opposed to technical analysis—to estimate the intrinsic value of a company. Here the "intrinsic" characteristic is the cash flow to be produced by the company in question. Intrinsic value is therefore defined to be the present value of all expected future net cash flows to the company; i.e. it is calculated via discounted cash flow valuation. (See also owner earnings and earnout.) Importantly, the required return used here to discount these cash flows, must include a risk premium appropriate to the company in question.

An alternative approach is to view intrinsic value as linked to the business' current operations. Here, under an asset-based valuation the business is seen as worth, at least, the sum of the fair market value of its assets (i.e. as opposed to their accounting-based book value, or break-up value). Relevant here are the fixed assets, working capital and (initial) "opex" required so as to replicate or recreate the ongoing business. Note though, that under this approach intangible assets (including "goodwill") are ignored, and the result may (will) then be understated. The valuation, is then (often) modified to also include estimated costs for any R&D and marketing required in this replication. See also Replacement value and Tobin's q.

== Real estate ==
In valuing real estate, a similar approach may be used. The "intrinsic value" of real estate is therefore defined as the net present value of all future net cash flows which are foregone by buying a piece of real estate instead of renting it in perpetuity. These cash flows would include rent, inflation, maintenance and property taxes. This calculation can be done using the Gordon model.

== See also ==
- Expected value
- Look-through earnings
- Net realizable value
- Option (finance) § Basic decomposition
  - Valuation of options § Intrinsic value
  - Option time value
- Terminal value
