= Operating cash flow =

Metric in financial accounting

In financial accounting, operating cash flow (OCF), cash flow provided by operations, cash flow from operating activities (CFO) or free cash flow from operations (FCFO), refers to the amount of cash a company generates from the revenues it brings in, excluding costs associated with long-term investment on capital items or investment in securities. Operating activities include any spending or sources of cash that’s involved in a company’s day-to-day business activities. The International Financial Reporting Standards defines operating cash flow as cash generated from operations, less taxation and interest paid, gives rise to operating cash flows. To calculate cash generated from operations, one must calculate cash generated from customers and cash paid to suppliers. The difference between the two reflects cash generated from operations.

Cash generated from operating customers:

- revenue as reported
- − increase (decrease) in operating trade receivables (1)
- − investment income (Profit on asset Sales, disclosed separately in Investment Cash Flow)
- − other income that is non cash and/or non sales related

Cash paid to operating suppliers:

- costs of sales − Stock Variation = Purchase of goods. (2)
- + all other expenses
- − increase (decrease) in operating trade payables (1)
- − non cash expense items such as depreciation, provisioning, impairments, bad debts, etc.
- − financing expenses (disclosed separately in Finance Cash Flow)

Notes

1. Operating: Variations of Assets Suppliers and Clients accounts will be disclosed in the Financial Cash Flow
2. Cost of Sales = Stock Out for sales. It is Cash Neutral. Cost of Sales − Stock Variation = Stock out − (Stock out − Stock In) = Stock In = Purchase of goods: Cash Out

== Operating Cash Flow vs. Net Income, EBIT, and EBITDA ==
Interest is a financing flow. It takes into consideration how the operations are financed or taxed. Since it adjusts for liabilities, receivables, and depreciation, operating cash flow is a more accurate measure of how much cash a company has generated (or used) than traditional measures of profitability such as net income or EBIT. For example, a company with numerous fixed assets on its books (e.g. factories, machinery, etc.) would likely have decreased net income due to depreciation; however, as depreciation is a non-cash expense, the operating cash flow would provide a more accurate picture of the company's current cash holdings than the artificially low net income.

Earnings before interest, taxes, depreciation and amortization (EBITDA) is a kind of operating income which excludes all non-operating and non-cash expenses. With it, factors like debt financing as well as depreciation, and amortization expenses are stripped out when calculating profitability. Thus, it can be used to analyze and compare profitability among companies and industries, as it eliminates the effects of financing and capital expenditures (which may also be deemed a demerit of the EBITDA measure). It is also a useful metric for understanding a business’s ability to generate cash flow for its owners and for judging a company’s operating performance. The difference between EBITDA and OCF would then reflect how the entity finances its net working capital in the short term. OCF is not a measure of free cash flow and the effect of investment activities would need to be considered to arrive at the free cash flow of the entity.

== See also ==
- Cash flow
- Cash flow statement
- Free cash flow
