= Michael J. Mauboussin =

American financial adviser

- Born: February 1964 (age 62)
- Education: Georgetown University
- Years active: 1992-2021
- Employers: Credit Suisse First Boston; Legg Mason Capital Management; BlueMountain Capital; Consumer Analyst Group of New York; Morgan Stanley

Michael J. Mauboussin (born February 1964) heads consilient research at Morgan Stanley division Morgan Stanley Investment Management's Counterpoint Global, an open-end mutual fund. Previously, he was director of research at BlueMountain Capital and head of global financial strategies at Credit Suisse, where he advised clients on valuation and portfolio positioning, capital markets theory, competitive strategy analysis, and decision making. He is also an adjunct professor of finance at the Columbia Business School and serves as chairman emeritus of the board of trustees at the Santa Fe Institute, a multi-disciplinary research center for complex adaptive systems, after serving as its chairman from 2012 until retiring in May 2021.

== Career ==
Mauboussin first joined Credit Suisse First Boston (CSFB) in 1992 as a packaged food industry analyst and later served as its managing director and chief U.S. investment strategist. He worked as a chief investment strategist at Legg Mason Capital Management from 2004 until leaving the firm in 2013, to rejoin Credit Suisse.

He is the former president of the Consumer Analyst Group of New York and has been "repeatedly named to Institutional Investor’s All-America Research Team and The Wall Street Journal All-Star survey".

During a February 2021 interview by The Economic Times, Mauboussin, noted as “one of Wall Street’s most creative and influential minds," stated that speculators now outnumbered investors in the marketplace.

== Personal life ==
He has a B.A. in government from Georgetown University. He is a resident of Darien, Connecticut.

== Publications ==
Mauboussin's writing has been featured in publications such as NPR, The Wall Street Journal, Fortune, Forbes, and SmartMoney.

=== Works ===
- The Investing Mind: A Guide to the Principles and Processes of Successful Investing Harriman House, 2026
- The Success Equation: Untangling Skill and Luck in Business, Sports, and Investing Harvard Business Review Press, 2012
- Think Twice: Harnessing the Power of Counterintuition Harvard Business School Press, 2009
- More Than You Know: Finding Financial Wisdom in Unconventional Places Columbia University Press, 2006
- Expectations Investing: Reading Stock Prices for Better Returns, co-author with Alfred Rappaport; Harvard Business School Press, 2001
- Thirty Years: Reflections on the Ten Attributes of Great Investors, 2021

== External links and references ==
- michaelmauboussin.com
- Faculty Page, gsb.Columbia.edu
- Profile, businessweek.com
- Interview, forbes.com
- Interview, seekingalpha.com
- Michael Mauboussin Resource Page, ritholtz.com
