= Shareholder =

Individual or organization that owns part of a corporation through shares of its stock

A shareholder (in the United States often referred to as a stockholder) refers to an individual or legal entity (such as another corporation, a body politic, a trust or partnership) who is registered by a corporation as the legal owner of shares of the corporations share capital. Both public companies and private corporation have shareholders. Shareholders may also be referred to as members of a corporation.

A person or legal entity becomes a shareholder in a corporation when they acquire shares and their name and other details are entered in the corporation's register of shareholders or members, and unless required by law the corporation is not required or permitted to enquire as to the beneficial ownership of the shares. A corporation generally cannot own its own shares.

The influence of shareholders on a business is determined by the shareholding percentage owned. Shareholders of corporations are legally separate from the corporation itself. They are generally not liable for the corporation's debts, and the shareholders' liability for company debts is said to be limited to the unpaid share price unless a shareholder has offered guarantees. The corporation is not required to record the beneficial ownership of a shareholding, only the owner as recorded on the register. When more than one person is on the record as owners of a shareholding, the first one on the record is taken to control the shareholding, and all correspondence and communication by the company will be with that person.

The board of directors of a corporation generally governs a corporation for the benefit of shareholders.

Shareholders may have acquired their shares in the primary market by subscribing to the IPOs and thus providing capital to the corporation. However, most shareholders acquire shares in the secondary market and provided no capital directly to the corporation. Shareholders may be granted special privileges depending on the particular share class that they hold.

== Types ==
=== Beneficial shareholders ===
A beneficial shareholder is the person or legal entity that has the economic benefit of ownership of the shares.

=== Nominee shareholders ===
A nominee shareholder is the person or entity that is on the corporation's register of members as the owner, while in reality that person acts for the benefit or at the direction of the beneficial owner, whether disclosed or not.

A nominee shareholder relationship in most jurisdictions is governed by trust law, and therefore is simple and passive: generally, the nominee is not required to do anything except carry out specific (lawful) actions if so directed by the beneficiaries. In the event that a nominee becomes insolvent, the beneficial shareholder should not be affected as the nominee's creditors cannot take possession of the trust assets.

In some Asian jurisdictions, nominee shareholding is achieved through contract law and is very complex and risky. For example, in China under the Supreme Court rules, using a nominee shareholder is ineffective in preventing debt collection actions, as a nominee shareholder cannot escape liability for this on the grounds that they are not the beneficial owner. If a capital call is made and the beneficial owner omits to provide additional funding, the nominee shareholder is liable to fund the capital call using their own funds. Finally, shares held by a nominee shareholder can be inherited or subject to marital property division.

=== Ordinary shareholders ===
An individual or legal entity that owns ordinary shares of a company (in the United States commonly referred as common stock) is usually referred to as an ordinary shareholder. This type of shareholding is generally the most common. Ordinary shareholders have the right to influence decisions concerning the company by participating at general meetings of the company and in the election of directors and can file class action lawsuits, when warranted.

=== Preference shareholders ===
Preference shareholders are owners of preference shares (in the United States commonly referred as preferred stock). They are paid a fixed rate of dividend, which is paid in priority to the dividend to be paid to the ordinary shareholders. Preference shareholders usually do not have voting rights in the company.

=== Institutional shareholders ===
Institutional shareholders are organizations that own shares in companies on behalf of themselves or other investors. Common examples include pension funds, mutual funds, exchange-traded funds (ETFs), insurance companies, hedge funds, sovereign wealth funds, and asset management firms. Because these institutions often manage large pools of capital, they may hold significant ownership stakes in publicly traded corporations.

Institutional shareholders can have greater influence over corporate governance than individual shareholders because of the size of their holdings. They may vote on the election of directors, executive compensation, mergers, shareholder proposals, and other matters submitted for shareholder approval. Large institutional investors may also communicate directly with company management and boards regarding issues such as corporate strategy, financial performance, governance practices, and risk management.

The degree of influence exercised by an institutional shareholder can depend on its investment strategy. Actively managed funds may buy or sell shares based on their assessment of a company's performance and may engage directly with management. Index funds and other passive investment funds, by contrast, generally seek to track a market index and may remain shareholders for long periods because they cannot easily sell individual companies without departing from the index they follow. As a result, voting and engagement can become particularly important tools for passive institutional investors.

Some asset managers exercise voting rights for shares held in funds on behalf of their clients. This can concentrate substantial voting power in a relatively small number of investment management firms even though the economic interests in the shares ultimately belong to many individual investors, pension beneficiaries, and other clients. The role of institutional shareholders has therefore become an important subject in discussions of corporate governance, shareholder activism, proxy voting, and the concentration of ownership and voting power in public companies.

== Rights ==
Subject to the applicable laws, the rules of the corporation and any shareholders' agreement, shareholders may have the right:

- To sell their shares.
- To vote on the directors nominated by the board of directors.
- To nominate directors (although this is very difficult in practice because of minority protections) and propose shareholder resolutions.
- To vote on mergers and changes to the corporate charter.
- To dividends if they are declared.
- To access certain information; for publicly traded companies, this information is normally publicly available.
- To sue the company for violation of fiduciary duty.
- To purchase new shares issued by the company.
- To vote on and file shareholder resolutions.
- To vote on management compensation (say on pay).
- To vote on management proposals.
- To delegate their rights to others. For example, from 1 October 2007, the Companies Act 2006 (in the United Kingdom) has allowed traded companies' registered members to allocate their "information rights" to another person or organisation if they own the shares on the latter's behalf.
- To receive a share of any assets which remain after a liquidation.

These rights can be generally classified into (1) cash-flow rights and (2) voting rights. While the value of shares is mainly driven by the cash-flow rights that they carry ("cash is king"), voting rights can also be valuable. The value of shareholders' cash-flow rights can be computed by discounting future free cash flows. The value of shareholders' voting rights can be computed by four methods:

- The difference between voting shares and non-voting shares (dual-class approach).
- The difference between the price paid in a block-trade transaction and the subsequent price paid in a smaller transaction on exchanges (block-trade approach).
- The implied voting value obtained from option prices.
- The excess lending fee over voting events.

== Stakeholders ==
Shareholders are considered by some writers to be a subset of stakeholders, who may include anyone who has a direct or indirect interest in the business entity. For example, employees, suppliers, customers, the community, etc., are typically considered stakeholders because they contribute value or are impacted by the corporation.

== See also ==
- Beneficial ownership
- Business valuation
- Class action
- Class A share
- Class B share
- Corporate governance
- Employee stock ownership
- Investor
- Real party in interest
- Shareholder value
- Social ownership
- Street name securities
