= Aswath Damodaran =

Indian-American academic

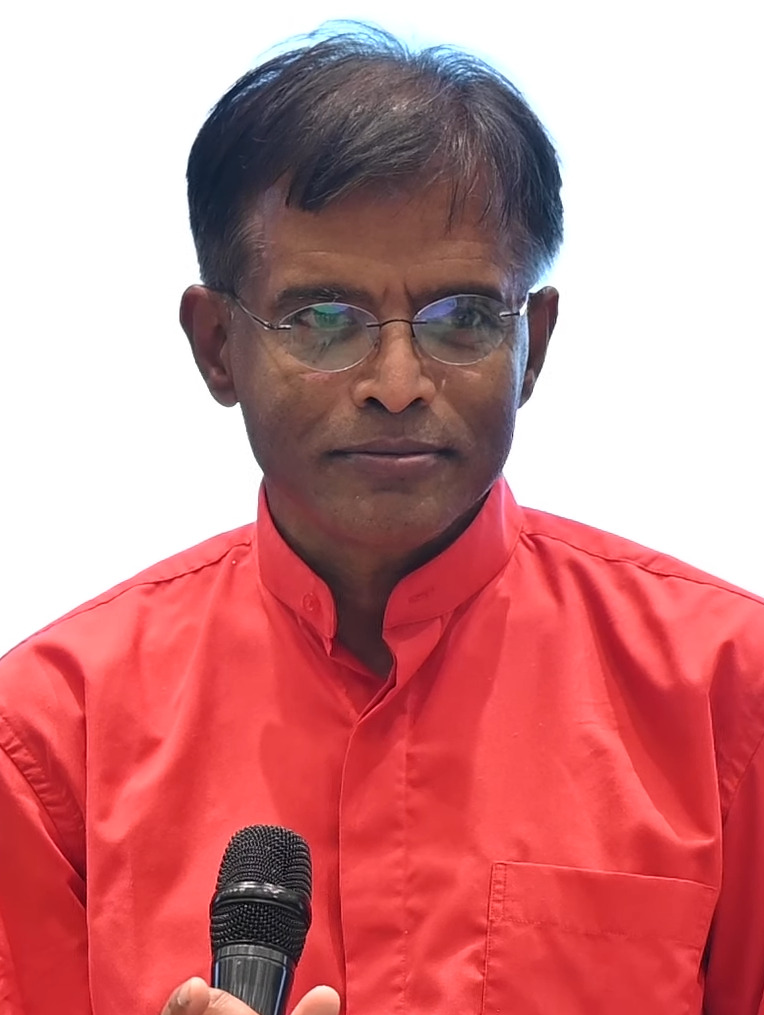
- Damodaran in 2023
- Born: Aswath Damodaran; September 23, 1957 (age 69); Chennai, India
- Education: Loyola College, Chennai (B.Com.); IIM Bangalore (PGDM); UCLA Anderson School of Management (MBA, PhD)
- Occupations: Professor, author
- Employer: New York University Stern School of Business
- Known for: Finance and investment research
- Awards: Richard L. Rosenthal Award for Innovation in Investment Management and Corporate Finance; Herbert Simon Award
- Website: Damodaran Online · blog

Aswath Damodaran (born 24 September 1957), is an Indian-American academic who currently serves as Kerschner Family Chair in Finance Education and is also Professor of Finance at Stern School of Business of New York University.

He is well known as the author of several widely used academic and practitioner texts on valuation, corporate finance and investment management; as well as a provider of comprehensive data for valuation purposes.

== Early life and education ==
He was born in a Mudaliar family in Chennai, India. Damodaran received a Bachelor of Commerce in Accounting from Loyola College, Chennai at University of Madras (1977) and a post graduate diploma in management (equivalent to an MBA) from the Indian Institute of Management Bangalore (1979). He later earned both Master of Business Administration in finance (1981) and Doctor of Philosophy in finance (1985) from Anderson School of Management at University of California, Los Angeles.

== Career ==
Damodaran has been a professor at New York University's Stern School of Business, since 1986, focusing on corporate finance and equity valuation.

He is on the faculty of the TRIUM Global Executive MBA Program, an alliance of NYU Stern, the London School of Economics and HEC School of Management. Other teaching includes the "Valuation" program for Stern Executive Education as well as the "Advanced Valuation" and "Corporate Finance" online certificates at NYU Stern. From 1984 to 1986 he was a visiting lecturer at the University of California, Berkeley.

== Works ==
As above, Professor Damodaran has written several books on equity valuation, as well as on corporate finance and investments.

- Damodaran on Valuation: Security Analysis for Investment and Corporate Finance (1994)
- Investment Valuation: Tools and Techniques for Determining the Value of Any Asset (1995; 3rd Edition 2012)
- Corporate Finance: Theory and Practice (1996)
- Applied Corporate Finance: A User's Manual (1998; 4th Edition 2014)
- The Dark Side of Valuation: Valuing Old Tech, New Tech, and New Economy Companies (2001; 2nd Edition 2009)
- Investment Philosophies: Successful Strategies and the Investors Who Made Them Work (2003)
- Investment Fables: Exposing the Myths of "Can't Miss" Investment Strategies (2004)
- Strategic Risk Taking: A Framework For Risk Management (2007)
- The Little Book of Valuation: How to Value a Company, Pick a Stock and Profit (2011)
- Narrative and Numbers: The Value of Stories in Business (2017)
- The Corporate Life Cycle: Managing, Valuation and Investing Implications (2024)

== See also ==
- Cost-benefit analysis
- New Yorkers in journalism
- Price-to-earnings ratio
