= Cash is king =

Expression emphasizing the importance of cash assets in economics

"Cash is king" is a colloquial phrase sometimes used in analyzing businesses or investment portfolios. It may refer to the importance of cash flow in the overall fiscal health of a business. In corporate finance, the expression refers to the fact that only future free cash flows or dividends are relevant for valuation and not, for example, accounting earnings. For managers and investors, it may also describe the advantage of having a large percentage of cash or short-term debt instruments available either due to falling financial markets or due to the availability of investment opportunities. The phrase has also come to be associated with businesses that only accept cash, rather than card payments.

The concept of "cash is king" describes the importance of sufficient cash as an asset in the business for short term operations, purchases and acquisitions. A company could have a large amount of accounts receivables on its balance sheet which would also increase equity, but the company could still be short on cash with which it can make purchases, including paying wages to workers for labor. Unless it was able to convert its accounts receivable and other current assets to cash quickly, it could fail and be technically bankrupt despite a positive net worth.

== History ==
The origin of "cash is king" is somewhat unclear. In George N. McLean's 1890 book How to do Business, or the Secret of Success in Retail Merchandizing, one of the "Twelve Wise Business Maxims" is "Avoid credit, remembering that cash is king, credit is a slave".

The phrase became more popular following the global stock market crash of 1987 by Pehr G. Gyllenhammar, then CEO of Swedish car group Volvo.

Since 2000, the expression, "cash is king", has occasionally appeared in articles on the investing website Motley Fool, and is part of radio host Dave Ramsey's hourly show introduction

The phrase was frequently used by billionaire property developer Alex Spanos, whose 2002 book, Sharing the Wealth: My Story, includes the phrase, used as a chapter title, and later adopted by another NFL team owner of Greek heritage, Jack Welch.

Widely used during the 2008 financial crisis and the Great Recession, the phrase was also often used to describe companies which could avoid share issues or bankruptcy.

The phrase has been repurposed more recently to indicate opposition to the increasing trend of transactions being made using card rather than physical currency. This meaning is different to the original usage because, from an accountancy perspective, there is no significant distinction between cash held in a bank and physical currency. The original usage suggests the superiority of liquid assets over fixed assets, but in this repurposed usage, the distinction made is between physical currency and cash reserves held digitally with a financial institution.

The phrase has had its resurgence in more recent years in the form of protests over cashless societies, and the right to privacy.
