= Cut off period =

Cutoff period is a term in finance. In capital budgeting, it is the period (usually in years) below which a project's payback period must fall in order to accept the project. Generally it is the time period in which a project gives its investment back if a project fails to do so the project will be rejected.

For example, a project has the following inflows years Inflows respectively 1 100,000 2 150,000 3 200,000

If the project's payback is 2 years having an outflow of 250,000 the cut off period must be 2 years otherwise the project will be rejected.

== Use in project evaluation ==
In capital budgeting, the payback period is a commonly used technique that measures the length of time required for a project’s cash inflows to equal the initial investment cost. Management often sets a predetermined maximum acceptable payback period — the cutoff period — as a screening criterion. Projects with payback periods shorter than or equal to this cutoff are accepted, while those with longer payback periods are rejected.

The payback period focuses on liquidity and risk assessment by indicating how quickly invested funds can be recovered. It is typically used as an initial screening tool in project evaluation because of its simplicity, although it does not account for the time value of money or cash flows beyond the cutoff period.
