= Alfred Rappaport (economist) =

American economist (born 1932)

Alfred Rappaport (born 1932; resided in La Jolla, California) is an American economist, educator and author, best known for further developing the idea of shareholder value, popularized by his 1986 book, Creating Shareholder Value. He is the Leonard Spacek Professor Emeritus at Kellogg School of Management at Northwestern University and was chairman of Chicago consulting firm The Alcar Group, with his ideas influential in Management consulting.

== Biography ==
In 1979, he co-founded The Alcar Group in Skokie, Illinois with Carl Noble Jr, and served as its chairman. Alcar designed financial modeling products used to analyze the monetary impact of various business strategies, including mergers and acquisitions, divestitures and debt restructuring. In 1993, Alcar merged with L.E.K. Partnership, which then rebranded to LEK/Alcar Consulting Group LLC. From the mid-1990s, the company pioneered value-based management (VBM), based on Rappaport's academic work. The company merged with software maker Hyperion Solutions in 2003.

== Works ==
Rappaport is the originator of "The Wall Street Journal Shareholder Scoreboard", which ranks total shareholder returns of the 1,000 highest value U.S. companies, published annually from 1995 to 2008. He was a regular contributor to The Wall Street Journal, The New York Times, Fortune, BusinessWeek, and the Harvard Business Review. His published books include:

- Creating Shareholder Value: The New Standard for Business Performance'; Simon and Schuster. 13 October 1999. ISBN 978-0-684-84456-5
- Expectations Investing: Reading Stock Prices for Better Returns; Harvard Business School publishing; with Michael Mauboussin (2001)
- Alfred Rappaport; John C. Bogle (19 August 2011). Saving Capitalism From Short-Termism: How to Build Long-Term Value and Take Back Our Financial Future. McGraw Hill Professional. ISBN 978-0-07-173637-4.
