= Investment Valuation =

Financial textbook

Investment Valuation: Tools and Techniques for Determining the Value of Any Asset
- 3rd edition cover
- Author: Aswath Damodaran
- Language: English
- Series: Wiley Finance
- Subject: Valuation, corporate finance, investment management
- Genre: Non-fiction
- Publisher: John Wiley & Sons
- Publication date: October 11, 1995
- Publication place: United States
- Media type: Print, e-book
- Pages: 544 pp. (1st edition)
- ISBN: 978-1118011522

Investment Valuation: Tools and Techniques for Determining the Value of Any Asset is a textbook on valuation, corporate finance, and investment management by Aswath Damodaran. The text was initially published by John Wiley & Sons on October 11, 1995, and is now available in its third edition as a part of Wiley Finance series.

== Review ==
For investors and students of the financial markets who want to embark on serious fundamental analysis, it is critical to understand how to go about valuing stocks and other instruments. There is no short cut. The person who runs a bunch of screens (low P/E, high growth, etc.) and thinks his output gives him an investing edge is deluding himself. Fundamental analysis involves hard work and an artful touch. Damodaran's Investment Valuation explains the hard work part.

—Review by Seeking Alpha

== See also ==
- Security Analysis (book)
- Valuation: Measuring and Managing the Value of Companies
