= Economic value added =

Value of a firm's profit after deduction of capital costs

In accounting, as part of financial statements analysis, economic value added (EVA) is an estimate of a firm's economic profit, or the value created in excess of the required return of the company's shareholders. EVA is the net profit less the capital charge ($) for raising the firm's capital. The idea is that value is created when the return on the firm's economic capital employed exceeds the cost of that capital, and equally if the return is less than the cost of capital, the firm is operating at a loss. The value of EVA can be determined by making adjustments to GAAP accounting. There are potentially over 160 adjustments, although in practice several key ones are mainly made, depending on the company and its industry.

== Calculation ==
EVA is calculated as net operating profit after taxes (NOPAT) less a capital charge, the latter being the product of the cost of capital and the economic capital. The basic formula is:

$$\begin{align}
\text{EVA} & = ( \text{ROIC} - \text{WACC} ) \cdot \text{capital} \\[8pt]
& = \text{NOPAT} - (\text{WACC} \cdot \text{capital}) \\[ 8pt]
& = \text{NOPAT} - \text{capital charge}
\end{align}$$

where:

- $\text{ROIC} = \frac{\text{NOPAT}} {\text{capital}}$ is the return on invested capital;
- $(\text{WACC}) \,$ is the weighted average cost of capital (WACC);
- $(\text{capital}) \,$is the economic capital employed;
- NOPAT is the net operating profit after tax, with adjustments and translations, generally for the amortization of goodwill, the capitalization of brand advertising and other non-cash items.

EVA calculation:

EVA = net operating profit after taxes – a capital charge [the residual income method]

therefore EVA = NOPAT – (c × capital), or alternatively

EVA = (r × capital) – (c × capital) so that

EVA = (r − c) × capital [the spread method, or excess return method]

where

r = rate of return, and
c = cost of capital, or the weighted average cost of capital (WACC).

NOPAT is profits derived from a company's operations after cash taxes but before financing costs and non-cash bookkeeping entries. It is the total pool of profits available to provide a cash return to those who provide capital to the firm.

Capital is the amount of cash invested in the business, net of depreciation. It can be calculated as the sum of interest-bearing debt and equity or as the sum of net assets less non-interest-bearing current liabilities (NIBCLs).

The capital charge is the cash flow required to compensate investors for the riskiness of the business given the amount of economic capital invested.

The cost of capital is the minimum rate of return on capital required to compensate investors (debt and equity) for bearing risk, their opportunity cost.

Another perspective on EVA can be gained by looking at a firm's return on net assets (RONA). RONA is a ratio that is calculated by dividing a firm's NOPAT by the amount of capital it employs (RONA = NOPAT/Capital) after making the necessary adjustments to the data reported by a conventional financial accounting system.

EVA = (RONA – required minimum return) × net investments

If RONA is above the threshold rate, EVA is positive.

== Comparison with other approaches ==
Other approaches along similar lines include residual income valuation (RI) and residual cash flow. Although EVA is similar to residual income, under some definitions there may be minor technical differences between EVA and RI (for example, adjustments that might be made to NOPAT before it is suitable for the formula below). Residual cash flow is another, much older term for economic profit. In all three cases, money cost of capital refers to the amount of money rather than the proportional cost (% cost of capital); at the same time, the adjustments to NOPAT are unique to EVA.

Although in concept, these approaches are in a sense nothing more than the traditional, commonsense idea of "profit", the utility of having a more precise term such as EVA is that it makes a clear separation from dubious accounting adjustments that have enabled businesses such as Enron to report profits while actually approaching insolvency.

Other measures of shareholder value include:

- Added value
- Market value added: the difference between the current market value of a firm and the capital contributed by investors
- Total shareholder return

== Process-based costing ==
In 2012, Mocciaro Li Destri, Picone and Minà proposed a performance and cost measurement system that integrates the EVA criteria with process-based costing (PBC). The EVA-PBC methodology allows one to implement the EVA management logic not only at the firm level but also at lower levels of the organization. EVA-PBC methodology plays a role in bringing strategy back into financial performance measures.

== See also ==
- Business valuation
- Enterprise value
- Opportunity cost
- Value added
