= Owner earnings =

Valuation method

Owner earnings is a valuation method detailed by Warren Buffett in Berkshire Hathaway's annual report in 1986. He stated that the value of a company is simply the total of the net cash flows (owner earnings) expected to occur over the life of the business, minus any reinvestment of earnings.

Buffett defined owner earnings as follows:

"These represent (a) reported earnings plus (b) depreciation, depletion, amortization, and certain other non-cash charges ... less (c) the average annual amount of capitalized expenditures for plant and equipment, etc. that the business requires to fully maintain its long-term competitive position and its unit volume ... Our owner-earnings equation does not yield the deceptively precise figures provided by GAAP, since (c) must be a guess - and one sometimes very difficult to make. Despite this problem, we consider the owner earnings figure, not the GAAP figure, to be the relevant item for valuation purposes ... All of this points up the absurdity of the 'cash flow' numbers that are often set forth in Wall Street reports. These numbers routinely include (a) plus (b) - but do not subtract (c)."

== Estimating Average Capital Expenditures ==
Average annual capital expenditures is, as Buffett mentions, an estimate. This number may be separated into maintenance capital expenditure (what's required to keep the business operating at current levels) and growth capital expenditure (what's required to grow the business). The most straightforward way to calculate maintenance capital expenditure is to simply use depreciation, amortization, and depletion. But those numbers don't necessarily reflect reality since depreciation schedules and the like don't necessarily line up with their actual useful lives. Similarly, simply using the most recent period's capital expenditure may not be representative of the annual capital expenditure required to run the business and it may also include a portion of "growth" capital expense.

One way, as proposed by Bruce Greenwald, to approximate maintenance capital expenditure, for use in an owner earnings calculation is to use a ratio of capital expenditure to sales over multiple past years. As formulated by Greenwald, this approximation works by:

1. Sum of property, plant, and equipment (PPE) from the balance sheet for the past 5 years
2. Sum sales from the income statement for the past 5 years
3. Dividing the sum of PPE by the sum of sales to find the average ratio of PPE-to-sales
4. Multiply the PPE-to-sales ratio by the nominal increase or decrease in sales from the prior year to the current year to find growth capital expenditure
5. Subtract calculated growth capital expenditure from the current year's capital expense on the balance sheet to find maintenance capital expenditure.

== See also ==
- Berkshire Hathaway
- Business valuation
- Cash flow forecasting
- Valuation (finance)
- Value investing
