= Market value added =

Measure comparing a firm's market value with the capital invested in it

Market value added (MVA) is the difference between the current market value of a firm and the capital contributed by investors. If MVA is positive, the firm has added value. If it is negative, the firm has destroyed value. The amount of value added needs to be greater so than the firm's investors could have achieved investing in the market portfolio, adjusted for the leverage (beta coefficient) of the firm relative to the market.

== Basic formula ==
The formula for MVA is:

$$MVA = V - K$$

where:

- MVA is market value added
- V is the market value of the firm, including the value of the firm's equity and debt
- K is the capital invested in the firm

MVA is the present value of a series of EVA values. MVA is economically equivalent to the traditional NPV measure of worth for evaluating the after-tax cash flow profile of a project if the cost of capital is used for discounting.

== See also ==
- Economic value added
