= Cash flow =

Movement of money into or out of a business, project, or financial product

Cash flow, in general, refers to payments made into or out of a business, project, or financial product. It can also refer more specifically to a real or virtual movement of money.

- Cash flow, in its narrow sense, is a payment (in a currency), especially from one central bank account to another. The term 'cash flow' is mostly used to describe payments that are expected to happen in the future, are thus uncertain, and therefore need to be forecast with cash flows.
- A cash flow (CF) is determined by its time t, nominal amount N, currency CCY, and account A; symbolically, CF = CF(t, N, CCY, A).

Cash flows are narrowly interconnected with the concepts of value, interest rate, and liquidity. A cash flow that shall happen on a future day t_{N} can be transformed into a cash flow of the same value in t_{0}. This transformation process is known as discounting, and it takes into account the time value of money by adjusting the nominal amount of the cash flow on the basis of the prevailing interest rates at the time.

== Cash flow analysis ==
Cash flows are often transformed into measures that provide information, e.g., about a company's value and financial situation:

- To determine a project's rate of return or value. The time of cash flows into and out of projects are used as inputs in financial models such as internal rate of return and net present value.
- To determine problems with a business's liquidity. Being profitable does not necessarily mean being liquid. A company can fail because of a shortage of cash even while profitable.
- As an alternative measure of a business's profits when it is believed that accrual accounting concepts do not represent economic realities. For instance, a company may be notionally profitable but generating little operational cash (as may be the case for a company that barters its products rather than selling for cash). In such a case, the company may be deriving additional operating cash by issuing shares or raising additional debt finance.
- Cash flow can be used to evaluate the 'quality' of income generated by accrual accounting. When net income is composed of large non-cash items it is considered low quality.
- To evaluate the risks within a financial product, e.g., matching cash requirements, evaluating default risk, re-investment requirements, etc.

Cash flow notion is based loosely on cash flow statement accounting standards. The term is flexible and can refer to time intervals spanning over past-future. It can refer to the total of all flows involved or a subset of those flows.

Within cash flow analysis, 3 types of cash flow are present and used for the cash flow statement:

- Cash flow from operating activities - a measure of the cash generated by a company's regular business operations. Operating cash flow indicates whether a company can produce sufficient cash flow to cover current expenses and pay debts.
- Cash flow from investing activities - the amount of cash generated from investing activities such as purchasing physical assets, investments in securities, or the sale of securities or assets.
- Cash flow from financing activities - the net flows of cash that are used to fund the company. This includes transactions involving dividends, equity, and debt.

In public finance and development economics, effective cash flow planning is also central to fiscal control, liquidity risk mitigation, and debt management.

== Business' financials ==
Cash flow is a critical indicator of a company's financial health, representing the net amount of cash and cash equivalents moving into and out of a business. The total net cash flow over a period (typically a quarter, half-year, or full year) equals the change in the cash balance during that period: positive if the cash balance increases, negative if it decreases. Net cash flow is calculated by subtracting total cash outflows from total cash inflows.

The total net cash flow for a project comprises three main components:

- Operating cash flow (OCF): Cash generated from a company's core business operations. OCF can be calculated using various formulas, such as:
  - OCF = EBIT × (1 − Tax Rate) + Depreciation
  - OCF = Net Income + Depreciation & Amortization + Changes in Working Capital

Depreciation provides a tax shield, reducing taxable income and thus increasing cash flow.

- Change in net working capital (NWC): The difference between current assets and current liabilities. An increase in NWC indicates that a company is using cash to fund assets like inventory, while a decrease suggests that the company is freeing up cash.
- Capital expenditures (CapEx): Funds used by a company to acquire or upgrade physical assets such as property, industrial buildings, or equipment. These are considered investments in the business's future operations.

The sum of these components determines the project's cash flow.

Similarly, a company's cash flow statement is divided into three sections:

- Operating activities: Cash flows from the primary revenue-generating activities, including receipts from sales of goods and services and payments to suppliers and employees.
- Investing activities: Cash flows related to the acquisition and disposal of long-term assets and investments, such as purchasing equipment or selling securities.
- Financing activities: Cash flows resulting from transactions with the company's owners and creditors, including issuing shares, borrowing, and repaying debts.

The aggregate of these three sections provides the total cash flow of the company.

== Examples ==
Description	Amount ($)	Totals ($)
Cash flow from operations		+70
Sales (paid in cash)	+30	
Incoming loan	+50	
Loan repayment	-5	
Taxes	-5	
Cash flow from investments		-10
Purchased capital	-10	
Total		60

The net cash flow provides insight into a company's liquidity but may not fully represent its financial health. For instance, consider the cash flows over three years of two companies:

	Company A			Company B		
	Year 1	Year 2	Year 3	Year 1	Year 2	Year 3
Cash flow from operations	+20M	+21M	+22M	+10M	+11M	+12M
Cash flow from financing	+5M	+5M	+5M	+5M	+5M	+5M
Cash flow from investment	-15M	-15M	-15M	0M	0M	0M
Net cash flow	+10M	+11M	+12M	+15M	+16M	+17M

While Company B shows higher net cash flow, Company A is generating more cash from its core operations and is investing significantly in long-term assets, which may yield returns in the future.

== See also ==
- Capital gain
- Cash flow sign convention
- Cash flow forecasting
- Cash flow statement
- Investment
- Owner earnings
- Passive income
- Profit
- Return of capital
- Return on equity
