= Accounting for leases in the United States =

US accounting standard

Accounting for leases in the United States is regulated by the Financial Accounting Standards Board (FASB) by the Financial Accounting Standards Number 13, now known as Accounting Standards Codification Topic 840 (ASC 840). These standards were effective as of January 1, 1977. The FASB completed in February 2016 a revision of the lease accounting standard, referred to as ASC 842.

Separate standards exist for governments and government agencies. Federal government accounting is overseen by the Federal Accounting Standards Advisory Board, whose SSFAS 54 for leases takes effect on October 1, 2023. For state and local governments and agencies, accounting is regulated by the Governmental Accounting Standards Board, whose GASB 87 leases standard took effect with the start of fiscal years after June 15, 2021.

== Introduction ==
A lease is a contract calling for the lessee (user) to pay the lessor (owner) for use of an asset for a specified period of time. A rental agreement is a lease in which the asset is tangible property. As there are many ways to view how these contracts affect the balance sheets of both the lessee and lessor, FASB created a standard for US accountants and businesses.

== Accounting for leases under FAS 13/ASC 840 ==
The accounting profession recognizes leases as either an operating lease or a capital lease (finance lease). An operating lease records no asset or liability on the financial statements, the amount paid is expensed as incurred. On the other hand, a capital lease is recorded as both an asset and a liability on the financial statements, generally at the present value of the rental payments (but never greater than the asset's fair market value). To distinguish the two, the Financial Accounting Standards Board (FASB) provided criteria for when a lease should be capitalized, and if any one of the criteria for capitalization is met, the lease is treated as a capital lease and recorded on the financial statements. The primary standard for lease accounting is Statement of Financial Accounting Standards No. 13 (FAS 13), which has been amended several times; it is known as topic 840 in the FASB's new Accounting Standards Codification.

The basic criteria for capitalization of a lease by lessee are as follows:

- The lessor transfers ownership of the asset to the lessee at the end of the lease term.
- A bargain purchase option is given to the lessee. This is an option that allows the lessee, upon termination of the lease, to purchase the leased asset at a price significantly lower than the expected fair market value of the asset.
- The life of the lease is equal to or greater than 75% of the economic life of the asset.
- The present value of the minimum lease payments (MLP) is equal to or greater than 90% of the fair market value of leased property. To understand and apply this criterion, you need familiarize yourself with what is included in the minimum lease payments and how the present value is calculated. The minimum lease payments include the minimum rental payments minus any executory cost, the guaranteed residual value, the bargain purchase option, and any penalty for failure to renew or extend the lease. The amount calculated is then discounted using the lessee’s incremental borrowing rate. However, if the lessee knows the implicit rate used by the lessor and the rate is less than the lessee’s rate, the lessee should use the lessor’s rate to discount the minimum lease payment.

These are called the 7(a)-7(d) tests, named for the paragraphs of FAS 13 in which they are found.

If any of the above are met, the lease would be considered a capital or financing lease and must be disclosed on the lessee's balance sheet. Conversely, if none of the criteria are met, the contract is an operating lease, and the lessee will have a footnote in its balance sheet to that effect. Both parties (lessor and lessee) must review these criteria at the outset and determine independently the classification as it is possible to classify them differently (it is quite common, in fact, for a single lease to be considered a capital lease by lessors and an operating lease by lessees).

If the term of the lease does not exceed 12 months, the lease may be considered neither of the above criteria. These contracts are "rentals" and do not need to be disclosed in lessee's footnotes.

For a more in depth explanation, see the accounting textbook Intermediate Accounting, 11th ed, Kieso Weygandt Warfield.

=== Lessee Accounting ===
Under an operating lease, the lessee records rent expense (debit) over the lease term, and a credit to either cash or rent payable. If an operating lease has scheduled changes in rent, normally the rent must be expensed on a straight-line basis over its life, with a deferred liability or asset reported on the balance sheet for the difference between expense and cash outlay.

Under a capital lease, the lessee does not record rent as an expense. Instead, the rent is reclassified as interest and obligation payments, similarly to a mortgage (with the interest calculated each rental period on the outstanding obligation balance). At the same time, the asset is depreciated. If the lease has an ownership transfer or bargain purchase option, the depreciable life is the asset's economic life; otherwise, the depreciable life is the lease term. Over the life of the lease, the interest and depreciation combined will be equal to the rent payments.

For both capital and operating leases, a separate footnote to the financial statements discloses the future minimum rental commitments, by year for the next five years, then all remaining years as a group.

Other lessee financial accounting issues:

- Leasehold Improvements: Improvements made by the lessee. These are permanently affixed to the property, and revert to the lessor at the termination of the lease. The value of the leasehold improvements should be capitalized and depreciated over the lesser of the lease life or the leasehold improvements life. If the life of the leasehold improvement extends past the life of the initial term of the lease and into an option period, normally that option period must be considered part of the life of the lease. If the lessor gives the lessee a cash allowance for improvements, this is treated as a reduction of rent and amortized over the lease term.
- Lease Bonus: Prepayment for future expenses. Classified as an asset; amortized using the straight-line method over the life of the lease.
- Rent Kicker, or Percentage Rent: Common in retail store leases. This is a premium rent payment that the lessor requires and is treated as a period expense. For example, it may be stated in the contract that if sales are over $1,000,000, any excess over this amount will have 2% taken out as a rent kicker. This is not reported as part of the future minimum rental commitments disclosure, nor in the 7(d) test to determine whether the lease is capital or operating.

=== Lessor Accounting ===
Under an operating lease, the lessor records rent revenue (credit) and a corresponding debit to either cash/rent receivable. The asset remains on the lessor's books as an owned asset, and the lessor records depreciation expense over the life of the asset. If the rent changes over the life of the lease, normally the rental income is recognized on a straight-line basis (also known as rent leveling), and the difference between income and cash received is recorded as a deferred asset or liability (mirroring lessee accounting).

Under a capital lease, the lessor credits owned assets and debits a lease receivable account for the present value of the rents (an asset, which is broken out between current and long-term, the latter being the present value of rents due more than 12 months in the future). With each payment, cash is debited, the receivable is credited, and unearned (interest) income is credited. If the cost or carrying amount of the asset being leased is different from its fair value at inception, then the difference is recognized as a profit and the lease is called a sales-type lease. This most commonly applies when a manufacturer is using leasing as a method of selling its product. Other capital lessor leases, where the cost and fair value are the same, are called direct financing leases. A third type of lessor capital lease, called a leveraged lease, is used to recognize leases where the acquisition of the leased asset is substantially financed by debt.

== Lease Accounting Revision (ASC 842) ==
As part of their joint commitment to the “development of high quality, compatible accounting standards that could be used for both domestic and cross-border financial reporting”, the International Accounting Standards Board (IASB) and the FASB agreed in 2006 to priorities and milestones for convergence of lease accounting rules. The project goal, “to insure that investors and other users of financial statements are provided useful, transparent, and complete information about leasing transactions in the financial statements”, reflected investor and regulator concerns that current accounting standards fail to clearly portray the resources and obligations from leases in a complete and transparent manner. The goal of these changes was to increase transparency within the rules and eliminate a loophole that allows for off-balance-sheet financing through leases.

The project commenced in 2006. Critical dates within the project include;

- Issuance of a Discussion Paper - Leases: Preliminary Views - on 19 March 2009 with a public comment period open until 17 July 2009
- Issuance of joint Exposure Drafts on 17 August 2010 with a public comment period open until 15 December 2010
- Issuance of a second joint Exposure Draft on 16 May 2013, with a public comment period open until 13 September 2013
- Issuance of International Financial Reporting Standard 16 (IFRS 16), Leases, on 13 January 2016
- Issuance of ASC 842, as Accounting Standards Update 2016-02, on 25 February 2016

The Effective Date of the new standard - date at which time all companies must follow the new lease accounting standard when preparing financial statements –is fiscal years beginning after December 15, 2018. As originally released, ASC 842 required companies to restate comparable years in their annual reports. Most U.S. companies include two years of comparables in their annual report, so leases would, in 2019, be restated using the new standard effective 2017. In March 2018, however, the FASB announced a transition relief giving companies the option to transition without restating prior years. Privately held companies may delay compliance until the end of fiscal year 2020.

=== Proposed changes ===
The Preliminary Views and first Exposure Draft called for eliminating the FAS 13 test which classifies leases as operating leases or capital leases, and treating all leases similarly to current capital leases. All leases would be accounted for as assets and liabilities on the balance sheet – on the asset side as "right-of-use assets" and on the liability side as lease liabilities; on the income statement, depreciation and interest expense would be recognized instead of rent expense. One implication of this is that expenses are "front loaded," because interest expense is higher in the early part of the lease term while the liability is higher. Following substantial protests from both financial statements preparers and users, the second Exposure Draft reinstated two types of lease accounting, with "Type A" leases treated essentially the same as FAS 13 capital leases and "Type B" leases maintaining the single lease expense, straight line over the life of the lease, that characterizes FAS 13 operating leases, but with an asset and liability on the balance sheet. The liability would be the present value of the remaining rents; the asset would be the same as the liability for simple leases, but then adjusted for scheduled changes in rents (which under FAS 13 result in a deferred rent liability or asset) and amortization of initial direct costs and lease incentives. Effective with the second Exposure Draft, the new standard has been given the new Accounting Standards Codification topic number 842 (the topic number for leases was previously 840).

While the first Exposure Draft envisioned including rent judged "more likely than not" to be paid (contingent rents and options to renew) in addition to minimum required rent payments, subsequent decisions by the boards reversed these plans, making the proposed accounting for lessees similar to that of existing capital leases. Lessor accounting was largely reverted to the existing standard. Leases with a maximum term of 12 months or less would be treated in accordance with current operating lease rules.

Following the second Exposure Draft, the IASB decided to require all leases to be treated as finance leases. The FASB decided to maintain the traditional distinction between capital (finance) and operating leases (and reverted to that terminology rather than "Type A/B").

=== Lessee Accounting ===
In the final ASC 842 release, capital lease accounting has only minor changes, though they are now called "finance leases," consistent with IFRS terminology. The concept of "executory costs," which were excluded from capitalization under FAS 13, has been replaced by "nonlease components," which are payments due as part of a lease agreement which reflect goods or services separate from the asset. Importantly, passthrough costs paid by the lessor and rebilled to the lessee, such as taxes and insurance, no longer qualify to be excluded from capitalization (either for finance or for operating leases). This can mean a substantial difference in balance sheet impact between a real estate gross lease and net lease.

The tests to distinguish finance and operating leases are essentially unchanged, though written using "principles-based terminology" consistent with IFRS: for instance, a lease is a finance lease if the lease term covers a "major part" of the asset's economic life. The standard states in paragraph 842-10-55-2 that "one reasonable approach" is to use the 75% test of FAS 13, paragraph 7(c) to determine "major part," and the other paragraph 7 tests for the other ASC 842 tests. One additional criterion for finance lease classification is that "The underlying asset is of such a specialized nature that it is expected to have no alternative use to the lessor at the end of the lease term." (However, such a lease would normally have sufficient rent to meet the present value test anyway.)

For an operating lease, a liability and a right-of-use asset are set up at lease inception, at the present value of the rents plus any guaranteed residual. To the asset is added any initial direct costs and subtracted any lease incentives (such as a tenant improvement allowance). The liability is amortized using the interest method (like a mortgage). If the lease has the same rent over its life, the net asset at any point is equal to the liability, plus the unamortized balance of initial direct costs and lease incentives. If the rents change during the lease term, the difference between the cash rent and average rent is added to or subtracted from the asset as well.

A single lease expense is recognized for an operating lease, representing a combination of amortizing the asset and the liability. This is considered an operating expense, just as ASC 840 rent expense is, so there is usually no difference in a company's income statement or statement of cash flows compared to ASC 840.

Sale-leaseback accounting is no longer permitted if the seller-lessee has a continuing right of control, such as an option to purchase back the asset at a fixed price. A failed sale-leaseback transaction is treated as a financing.

=== Lessor Accounting ===
Most lessor accounting is not substantially changed between ASC 840 and ASC 842. The change from executory costs to nonlease components, discussed above, applies equally to lessors. Leveraged leasing is discontinued, though leveraged leases entered into before the effective date of ASC 842 can continue to be accounted for under ASC 840 unless they are modified. The distinction between sales-type and direct financing leases has changed: whereas in ASC 840 the test was whether the fair value of the leased asset was different from the lessor's cost or carrying amount (if so, the lease is a sales-type lease), in ASC 842, any lessor lease that meets the lessee finance lease tests (based on rents and guaranteed residuals due from the lessee) is a sales-type lease; direct financing treatment applies if the lease is capital only because a third-party residual guarantee causes the present value test to be met. The primary difference in accounting between a sales-type lease and a direct financing lease is that profit for a sales-type lease is recognized at inception, while profit for a direct financing lease is recognized over the life of the lease.

=== Impact of New Lease Accounting Rules ===
The U.S. Securities and Exchange Commission (SEC) in 2005 estimated that companies had approximately $1.25 trillion of operating lease commitments. By 2015, estimates had risen to $2 trillion. While the FASB specified that operating lease liabilities should be considered "non-debt liabilities," so that they should not affect debt ratios and most loan covenants, the addition of an equal asset and liability will reduce most companies' quick ratio, while the fact that an operating lease creates a current liability but not a current asset reduces the current ratio. Companies expected to be most affected include retail chains and airlines.

== Other Issues ==
Usually, when a lease is entered into, a security deposit is required. There are two types of security deposits:

- Nonrefundable security deposits: Deferred by the lessor as unearned revenue; Capitalized by the lessee as a prepaid rent expense until the lessor considers the deposit earned.
- Refundable security deposits: Treated as a receivable by the lessee; Treated as a liability by the lessor until the deposit is refunded to the lessee.

=== Calculation ===
How to calculate the lease rate:

[Monthly Lease Payment] x [Term (months)] = [Total amount out of pocket]
[Total amount out of pocket] - [Financed amount] = [Total finance charge]
[Total finance charge] / [Term (years)] = [Finance charge per year]
[Finance charges per year] / [Financed amount] = Annual Lease Rate

== See also ==
- FAS 13, Accounting for Leases
- Project Update on Topic 840
- FASB Topic 840 Documentation
- Accounting Standards Update 2016-02: Leases (Topic 842)
