= Vehicle registration plates of Poland =

Republic of Poland
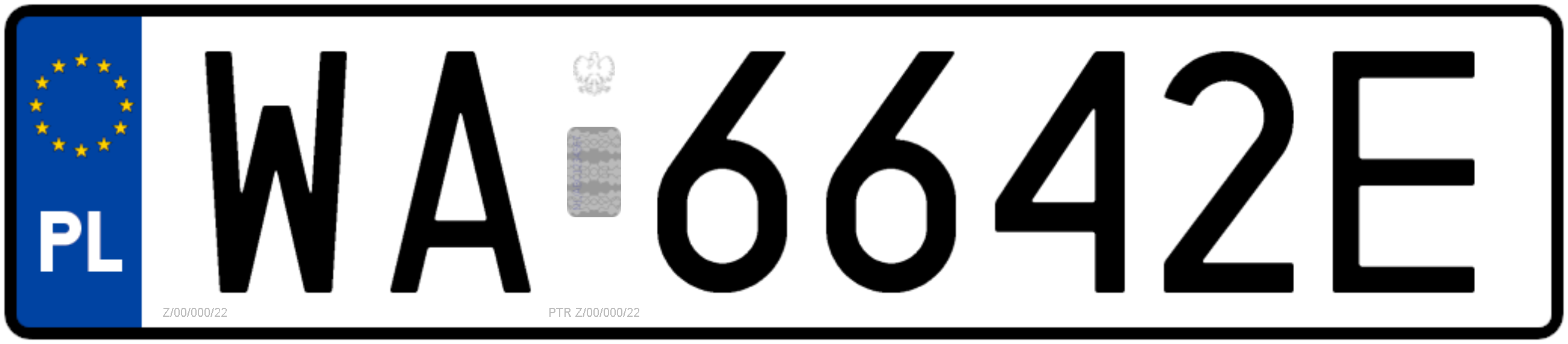
- Detailed example of a Polish license plate in current design
- Country: Poland
- Country code: PL

Current series
- Size: 520 mm × 110 mm 20.5 in × 4.3 in
- Serial format: PZ 7Y934
- Colour (front): Black on white
- Colour (rear): Black on white

Vehicle registration plates of Poland indicate the region of registration of the vehicle given the number plate.

== Law ==
According to Polish law, the registration plate is tied to the vehicle, not the owner. There is no possibility for the owner to keep the licence number for use on a different car, even if it's a cherished registration. The licence plates are issued by the powiat (county) of the vehicle owner's registered address of residence, in the case of a natural person. If it is owned by a legal person, the place of registration is determined by the person's address. Vehicles leased under operating leases and many de facto finance leases will be registered at the address of the lessor. When a vehicle changes hands, the new owner must apply for new vehicle registration document bearing their name and registered address. The new owner may obtain a new licence plate although it is not necessary. In such a situation the licence plates are usually carried over to the new owner, because the change carries an additional cost. Upon purchasing a vehicle from another person, if the vehicle has an EU plate, the new owner must replace it with a registration for their address and area, and give the EU plate to their powiat licensing authority to free up numbers in the future. If the car has a plate dated before May 1, 2006, the owner is free to do whatever they wish with it, as long as it is legal under Polish law. The plaque cannot be replaced if destroyed. The change of the whole set is required.

The change in system shown below in 2001 is related to the reduction in the previous year of the number of voivodeships in Poland from 49 to 16, based on the country's historic regions. The pre-2001 licence plates (white letters on black background) can be used indefinitely, but since they are obsolete they have to be replaced in case of change of vehicle's ownership.

In the pre-2001 model, there were not sufficient letters in the Polish alphabet for each of the old voivodeships to have a single letter. Only the standard latin alphabet was used (excluding Q), and the specific Polish characters with diacritics were excluded. Therefore, two letters had to be used to indicate the vehicle's origin (the middle administrative level of powiat was not introduced until 1999). Since the change, the first letter has always denoted the new voivodeship. One additional letter is used in cities with rights of powiat (this applies to 47 of 49 capitals of the old voivodeships, the exceptions being Ciechanów and Sieradz, and numerous major cities). Two additional letters are used in any other powiat.

It is not necessary for EU citizens to immediately re-register the vehicles they have brought with them if they are duly registered and taxed elsewhere in the EU, when living in Poland. This emerges from European law, although local regulations have to date not been changed to reflect the law, leading to officials locally sometimes giving incorrect advice on this point. When in doubt, motorists are recommended to refer to their respective embassies.

== Format ==
=== Stickers and security measures ===
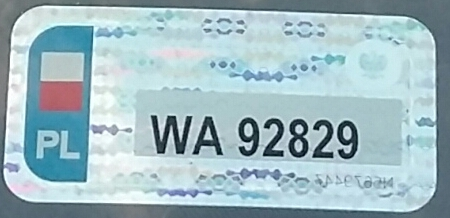
Windshield sticker (not issued since September 2022)

The licence plates are invalid without two adhesive stickers with holograms placed on the license plates, and, before 2022, an adhesive plaque bearing the same number as the plates inside the windshield. If the vehicle uses only one licence plate then the second sticker must be attached to the registration documents.

=== Licence plate types and combinations ===
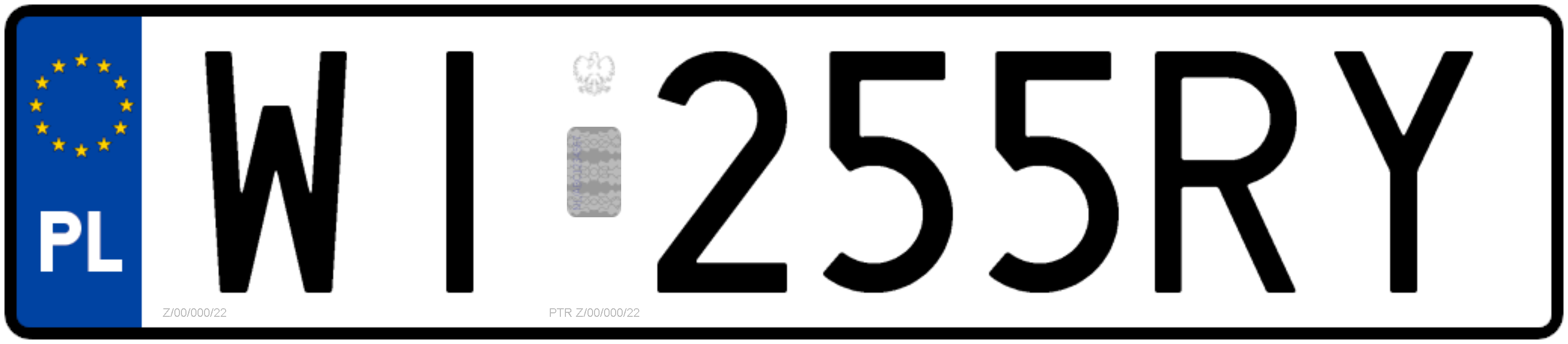
Polish license plates from Warsaw, current design since 2020

Each powiat uses a unique two or three letter code, with the first letter denoting the voivodeship. The number pools listed below are not used in any particular order, although one pool is usually depleted before the next one is used. A visible gap exists between the area code and series, but there is no possibility of confusion if the number is written down without it.

The following characters are used in licence plate examples:

- X – voivodeship code
- XY, XYZ – county code
- J, K, L – any allowed letter
- digits

Polish voivodeship license plate codes. First letter indicates the voivodeship.

The letters used in licence plates include all standard Latin alphabet letters outside of Q (not used at all in the Polish language). The letters B, D, I, O, and Z cannot be used in series area (on the right, after the gap), because they could be confused with similarly-looking digits. Custom plates are allowed to include these letters though. The leading 0 in numbers is part of the code and is never omitted.

Due to the pool of license plates combinations possibly running out in some areas, in 2022 the Ministry of Infrastructure issued a directive under which extra leading characters were introduced for several of the voivodeships:

- V for Lower Silesian (originally D)
- J for Lesser Poland (originally K)
- A for Masovian (originally W)
- Y for Subcarpathian (originally R)
- X for Pomeranian (originally G)
- I for Silesian (originally S)
- M for Greater Poland (currently unused, originally P)

Reportedly, the Warsaw district of Mokotów was the first to start issuing AE registration plates following the new directive.

==== Cars, trucks, and buses ====
Format:

- XY 12345
- XY 1234J
- XY 123JK
- XY 1J345
- XY 1JK45
- XYZ J234
- XYZ 12JK
- XYZ 1J34 (first digit cannot be 0)
- XYZ 12J4 (last digit cannot be 0)
- XYZ 1JK4 (neither digit can be 0)
- XYZ JK34
- XYZ 12345
- XYZ 1234J
- XYZ 123JK

The number of available unique numbers with these mentioned formats is 1,100,000 for each two-letter powiat code, and 872,400 for each three-letter powiat code. The combinations "XYZ 1234" and "XYZ 123J" are not used, because they would lead to creation of numbers identical to these in the old system. Also, the two-letter powiat codes must be followed by a leading digit, "XY 1...", to avoid confusion with the "XYZ ..." scheme, as the gap is not significant. Electric vehicles have green background on their license plates.

==== Motorcycles, mopeds, and agricultural vehicles ====
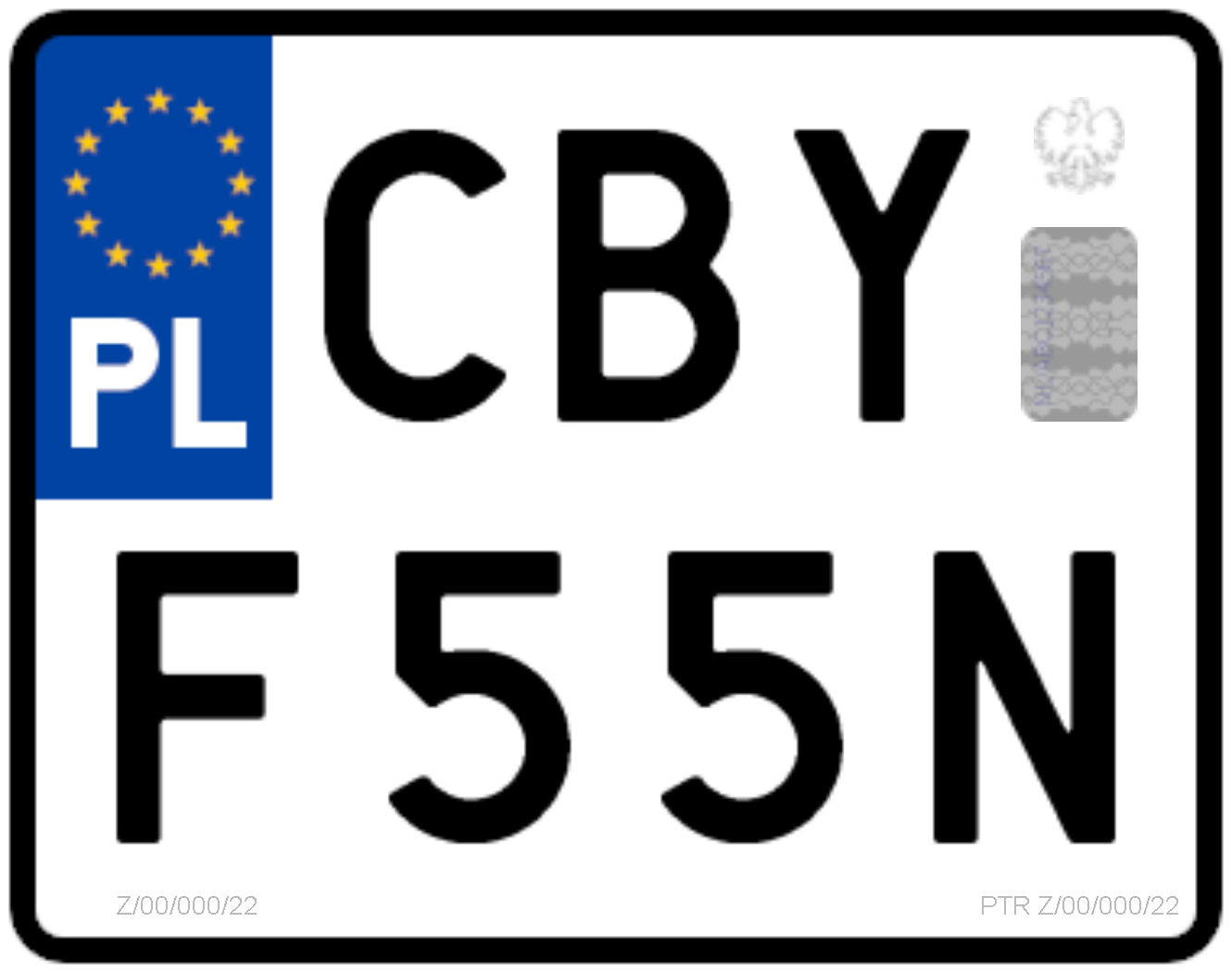
Motorcycle plate. "CBY" indicates Bydgoszcz County

Format:

- XY 1234
- XY 123J
- XY 1J34 (first digit cannot be 0)
- XY 12J4 (last digit cannot be 0)
- XY 12JK
- XY JK12
- XYZ J234
- XYZ 12JK
- XYZ 1J34 (first digit cannot be 0)
- XYZ 12J4 (last digit cannot be 0)
- XYZ 1JK4 (neither digit can be 0)
- XYZ JK34
- XYZ J23K
- XYZ J2KL (a digit cannot be 0)

Cars – reduced size

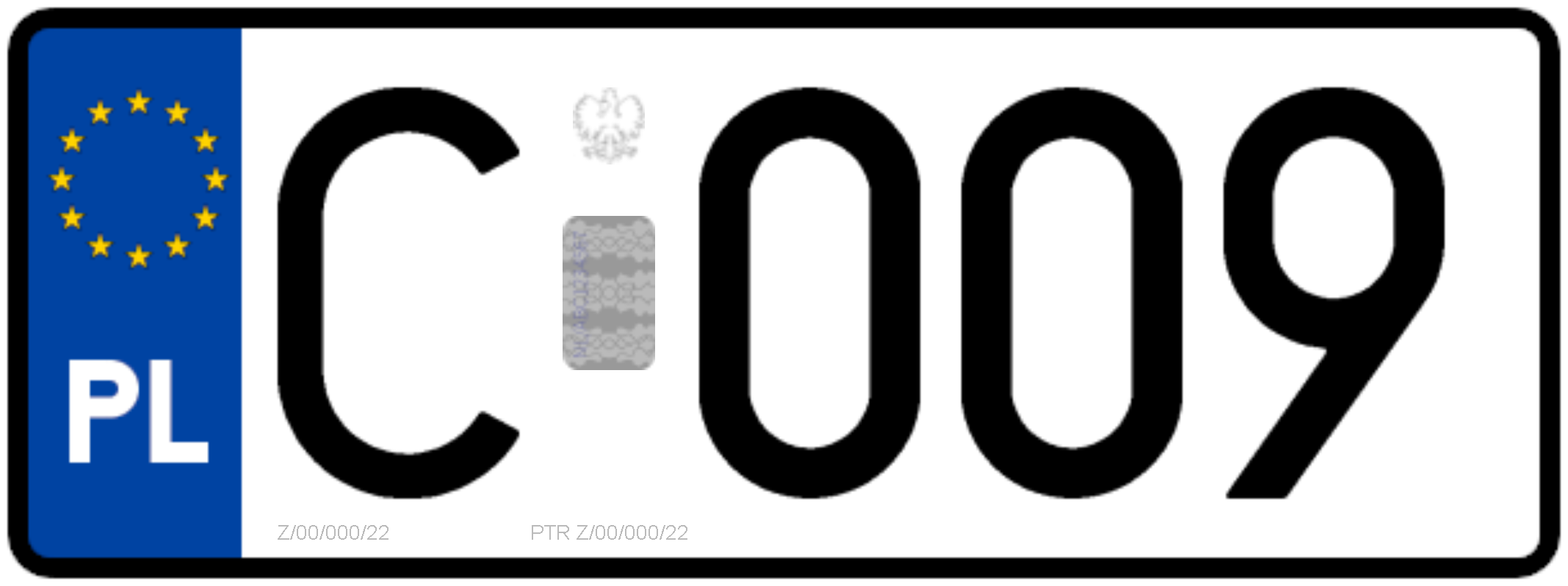
A reduced-size plate from the Kuyavian-Pomeranian Voivodeship.

Format:

- X 123
- X 12J
- X 1J2
- X J12
- X 1JK
- X JK1
- X J1K

The plates are designed for cars imported from USA and Japan. Reduced size plates are the same width as US plates.

==== Classic cars ====
Polish classic car's plate from Zabrze

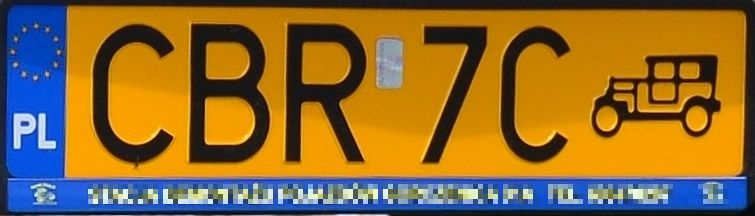
Polish classic car's plate (since May 1, 2006) from Brodnica County

Format:

- XY 12J
- XY 123
- XYZ 1J
- XYZ 12
- XYZ J1

These plates use black text on yellow background with an additional picture of a vintage car on the right side. Vehicles are required to meet three criteria:

- manufactured at least 30 years ago
- the particular model must be out of production for at least 15 years
- consist of at least 75% of original parts

These criteria, however, can be waived for special cases, such as prototype vehicles that were never mass-produced, cars of considerable historical value, cars being part of museum exhibition or models representing technological breakthroughs. As such, issuing of these plates is always handled on a case-by-case basis by the conservation officer. Registered classic cars are not required to undergo yearly technical checkup unless used for transportation services, such as taxi.

==== Temporary and export plates ====
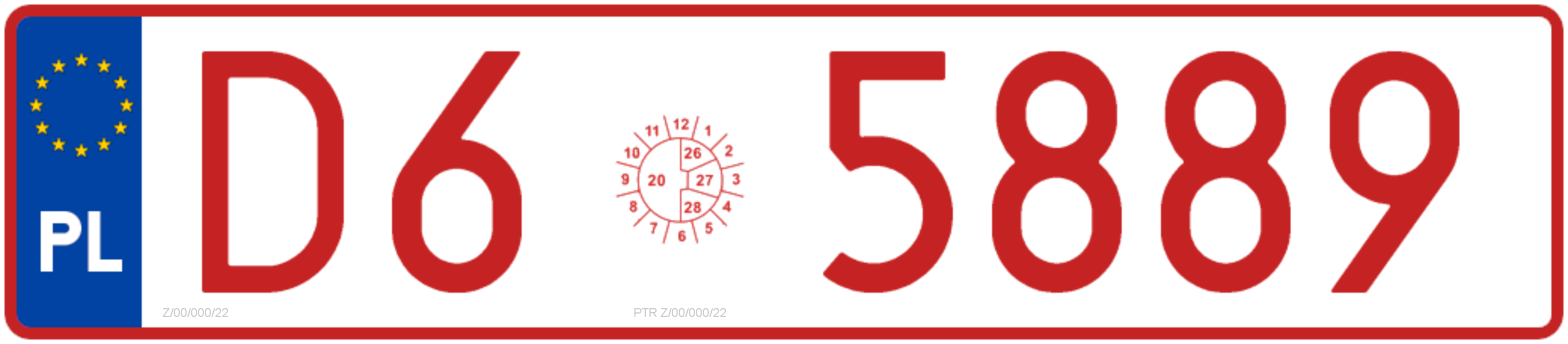
Polish temporary plate from the Lower Silesian Voivodeship

Format:

- X1 2345
- X1 234J

These plates use red text on a white background. The plates wear a seal with month and year of validation. The windshield plaque is not issued with it.

==== Electric car plates ====
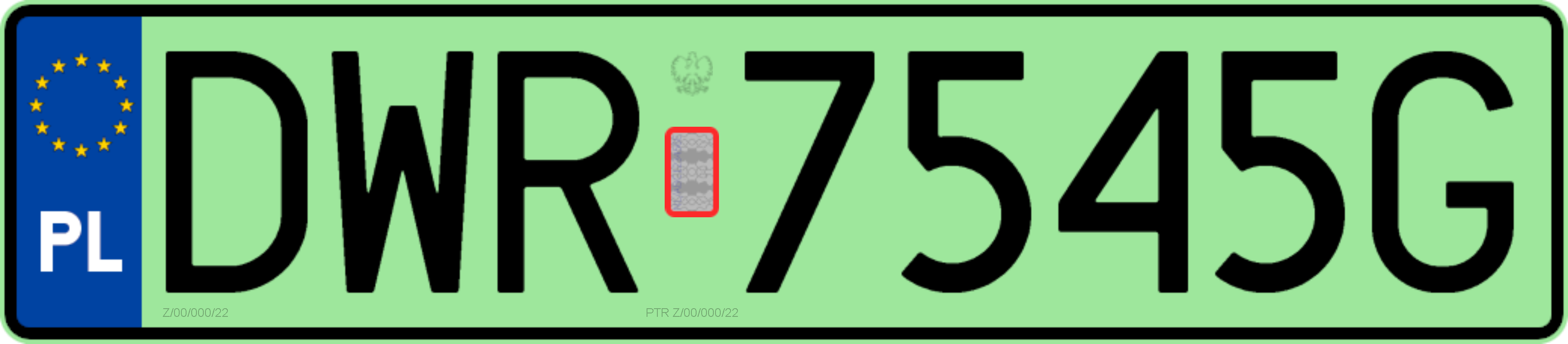
Polish electric/hydrogen car plate issued in Wrocław County, Lower Silesian Voivodeship.

Introduced on 1 January 2020, they are issued to battery-electric and hydrogen vehicles. They are similar to regular plates but the background colour is light green instead of white. Such vehicles are allowed to drive on bus lanes, therefore visibly different registration plates allow the police to establish whether a vehicle is doing so legally. Electric plates are also used in "American" plates with reduced space.

==== Testing vehicles ====
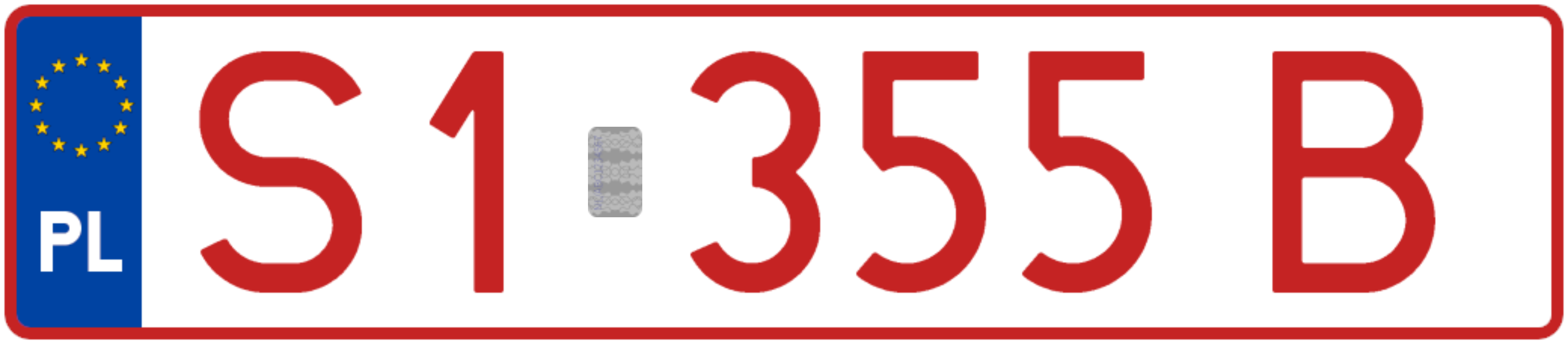
Polish testing plate from the Silesian Voivodeship

Format:

- X1 234 B

These plates use red text on a white background. The last character is always the letter B (which stands for badawcza, or "research type"). Only car manufacturers and automobile R&D centres are issued these plates.

==== Custom plates ====
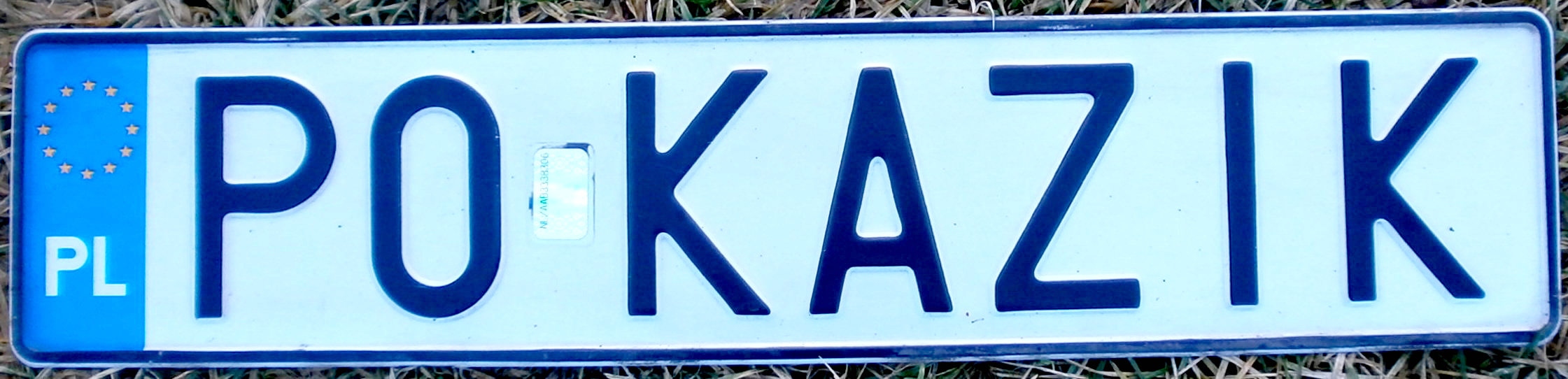
Custom licence plate from the Greater Poland Voivodeship. The P0 and a person's nickname "Kazik" look like the word for a "little show"

Format:

- X1 JKLMN

These plates use standard black letters on a white background. Each custom number starts with the letter denoting voivodeship and a single digit, followed by the gap. This digit and next characters can be picked by the owner. Outside the availability the following constrains are used:

- after the gap between 3 and 5 characters can be used
- the first character must be a letter
- no more than 2 last characters can be digits
- all letters come before digits (i.e. they cannot be intermixed)
- any standard Latin letter outside Q can be used (unlike common licence plates)
- resulting plate must not contain or resemble offensive contents

==== Professional plates ====
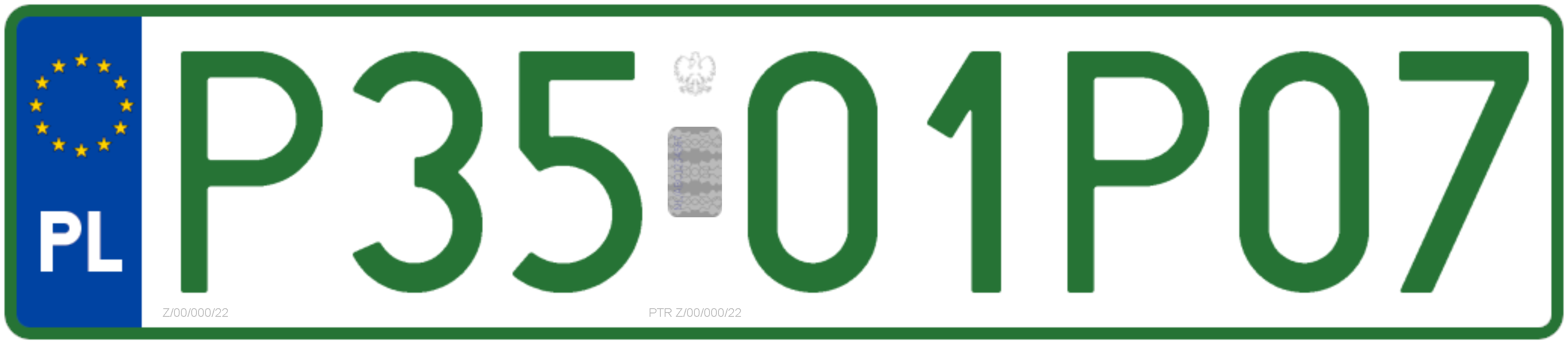
Professional registration plate issued in Greater Poland Voivodeship. Note the green tint on the letters.

Format:

- X12 34P56 (second letter is always "P")

Since July 2019 dealers of new cars can apply for special number plates with green letters on white background specifically for doing test drives. Those plates are issued exclusively for the company itself and not for a specific vehicle. This means they can be applied to multiple vehicles when needed. Only car retailers can obtain these and such cars can be driven only by the car dealer, owner of the company, their employees or customers, but only when accompanied by an employee.

==== Diplomatic plates ====
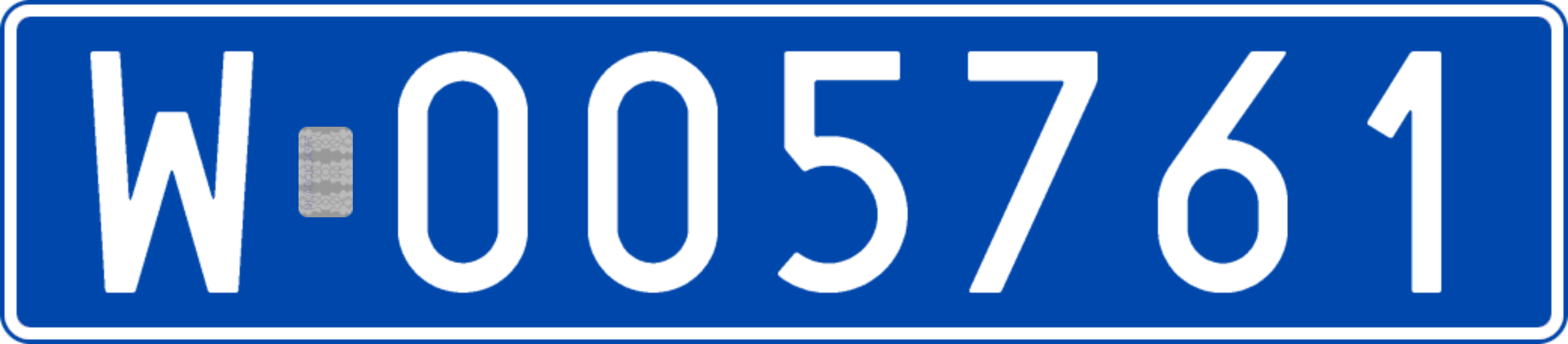
Polish diplomatic plate issued for the diplomatic personnel of the consulate (which is indicated by 761) for Germany (indicated by 005).

Format:

- X 123456

White symbols on dark blue background. The leading character is reserved for voivodeship, but in practice all vehicles are issued W and registered by the Masovian voivode. The first three digits indicate a country or organization as listed in the table below.

Code	Country
001	United States
002	United Kingdom
003	France
004	Canada
005	Germany
006	Netherlands
007	Italy
008	Austria
009	Japan
010	Turkey
011	Belgium
012	Denmark
013	Norway
014	Greece
015	Australia
016	Algeria
017	Afghanistan
018	Argentina
019	Brazil
020	Bangladesh
021	Egypt
022	Ecuador
023	Finland
024	Spain
025	Iraq
026	Iran
027	India
028	Indonesia
029	Colombia
030	Malaysia
031	Libya
032	Morocco
033	Mexico
034	Nigeria
035	Pakistan
036	Portugal
037	Palestine
038	Syria
039	Sweden
040	Switzerland
041	Tunisia
042	Thailand
043	Venezuela
044	Uruguay
045	Peru
046	Yemen
047	Costa Rica
048	Democratic Republic of Congo
049	Israel
050	Nicaragua
051	Chile
052	Holy See
053	South Korea
054	(European Union) European Commission
055	Ireland
056	World Bank Group
057	International Monetary Fund
058	Philippines
059	International Finance Corporation
060	South Africa
061	Office for Democratic Institutions and Human Rights
062	Cyprus
063	Kuwait
064	United Nations
065	Russia
066	Slovakia
067	Czech Republic
068	Bulgaria
069	Hungary
070	Romania
071	Vietnam
072	Serbia
073	North Korea
074	Cuba
075	Albania
076	China
077	Mongolia
078	International Labour Organization
079	Organization for Cooperation of Railways
081	Laos
082	Angola
083	Ukraine
084	European Bank for Reconstruction and Development
085	Lithuania
086	Belarus
087	Latvia
088	Croatia
089	Lebanon
090	Slovenia
091	Guatemala (disputed)
092	Estonia
093	North Macedonia
094	Moldova
095	Israel
096	Armenia
097	Sri Lanka
098	Kazakhstan
099	Saudi Arabia
100	Georgia
101	Uzbekistan
102	United Nations Human Settlements Program
103	New Zealand
104	Azerbaijan
105	Sovereign Military Order of Malta
106	Cambodia
107	Frontex
108	Luxembourg
109	Bosnia and Herzegovina
110	Panama
111	Qatar
112	Malta
113	United Arab Emirates
114	Montenegro
115	Senegal
116	Bangladesh
117	Rwanda
118	Iceland
119	UNICEF
120	World Health Organization
121	Kosovo

On top of the origin of the diplomatic mission, the vehicle's function can also be determined by the latter three digits:

- 001–199 – embassy diplomatic personnel private vehicles
- 200–299 – military attaché private vehicles
- 300–499 – embassy non-diplomatic personnel private vehicles
- 500–501 – chief of mission official vehicles
- 502–699 – embassy's other official vehicles
- 700–799 – consulate's diplomatic personnel private vehicles
- 801 – consul official vehicles
- 800, 802–899 – consulate diplomatic personnel official vehicles
- 900–999 – consulate's other official vehicles

Diplomatic vehicles are also required to carry a sticker with CD (corps diplomatique) or CC (corps consulaire).

==== Service plates ====
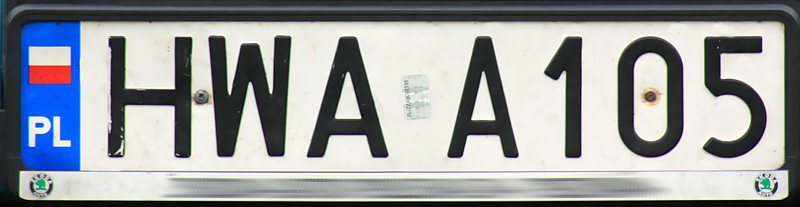
Polish border guard plate

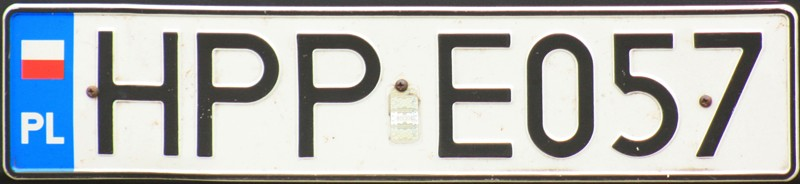
Polish police plate

Format:

- H#J K234
- H#J 12KL

Vehicles utilised used by the Polish Ministry of Internal Affairs and Administration use licence plates beginning with "H", instead of the voivodeship code. The second letter denotes the service, for example "HP" is used by the Polish Police. Any standard Latin letter outside Q can be used (unlike common licence plates). These services are also allowed to use common licence plates.

Codes:

- HA# – Central Bureau of Anticorruption
- HB# – Government Protection Bureau
- HC# – Customs Service
- HK# – Internal Security Agency, Foreign Intelligence Agency
- HM# – Military Counterintelligence Agency, Military Intelligence Agency
- HP# – Police
- HS# – Fiscal Control
- HW# – Border Guard

==== Military plates ====
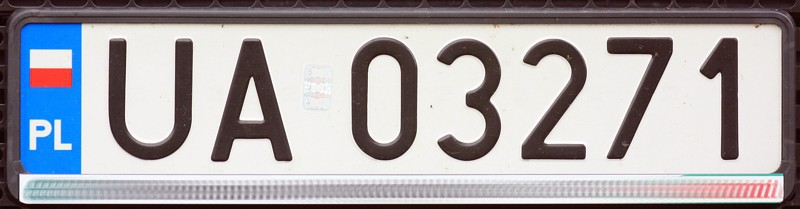
Polish military plate

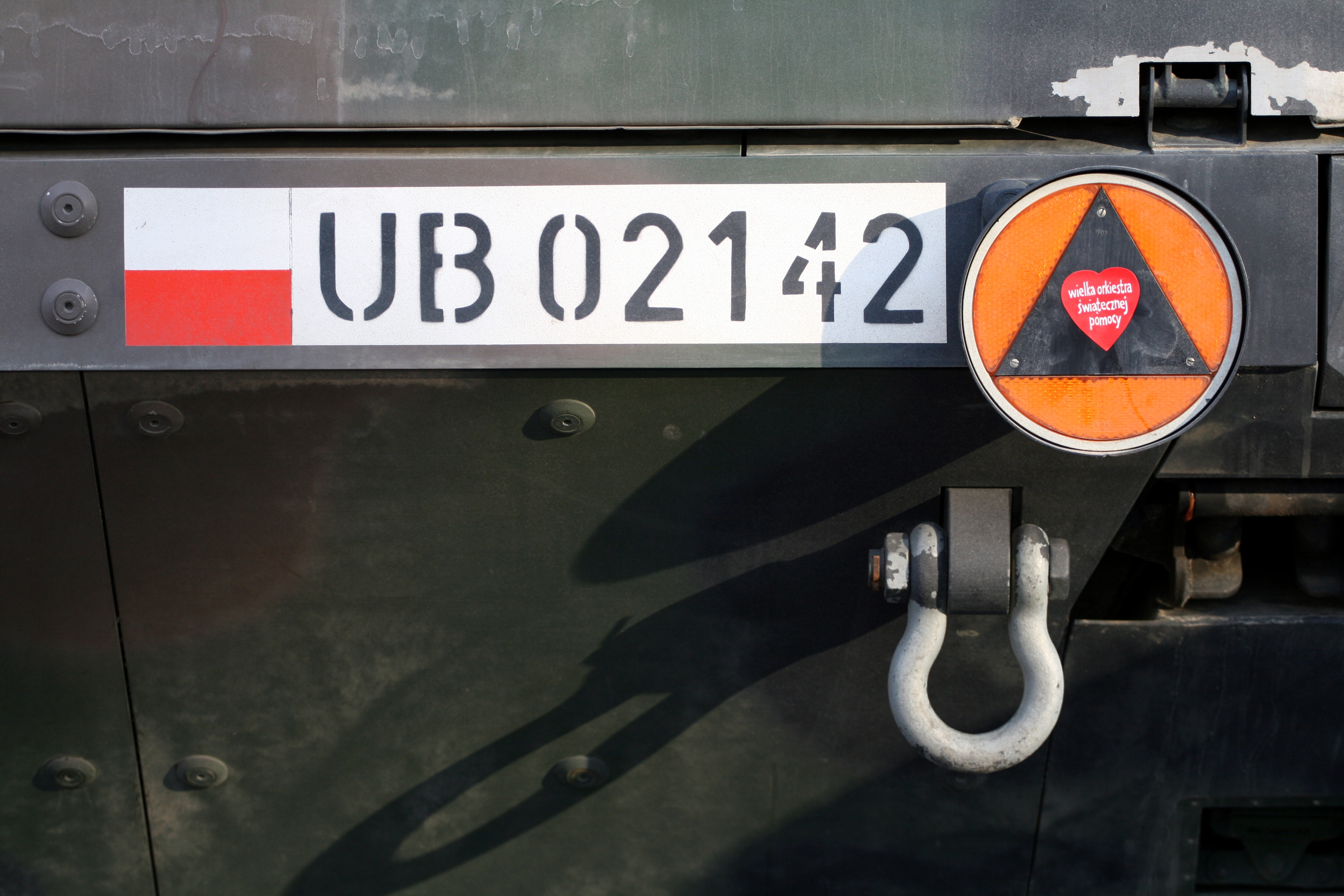
Military plates can also be painted on.

Format:

- U# 12345
- UC 1234T
- UK 1234

The Polish military uses licence plates beginning with "U" instead of the voivodeship code. The following letter denotes the usage of the vehicle. For example, military trucks have licence plates beginning with "UC". The trailing T in the number denotes a tracked vehicle. The military are not obliged to use the standard licence plates on tracked vehicles, armoured cars and armoured personnel carriers — they can be painted on the vehicle itself or applied as a sticker.

Codes:

- UA# – Cars, offroad vehicles and specialistic vehicles based on cars or off-roaders
- UB# – Armoured personnel carriers
- UC# – Military trucks
- UD# – Buses
- UE# – Trucks
- UG# – Special trucks
- UI# – Transport trailers
- UJ# – Special trailers
- UK# – Motorcycles

== Cost of purchasing registration plates ==
- Regular: 80 złoty
- Motorcycles: 40 złoty
- Mopeds: 30 złoty
- Custom regular: 200 złoty
- Custom motorcycles: 140 złoty
- Classic cars: 100 złoty
- Temporary: 30 złoty

== District indicators ==
Lower Silesian Voivodeship	Kuyavian-Pomeranian Voivodeship	Łódź Voivodeship	Lublin Voivodeship
DB – Wałbrzych (city county); DBA – Wałbrzych County; DBL – Bolesławiec County; DDZ – Dzierżoniów County; DGL – Głogów County; DGR – Góra County; DJ – Jelenia Góra (city county); DJA – Jawor County; DJE – Karkonosze County; DKA – Kamienna Góra County; DKL – Kłodzko County; DL – Legnica (city county); DLB – Lubań County; DLE – Legnica County; DLU – Lubin County; DLW – Lwówek County; DMI – Milicz County; DOA – Oława County; DOL – Oleśnica County; DPL – Polkowice County; DSR – Środa County; DST – Strzelin County; DSW – Świdnica County; DTR – Trzebnica County; DW, DX, VW – Wrocław (city county); DWL – Wołów County; DWR – Wrocław County; DZA – Ząbkowice County; DZG – Zgorzelec County; DZL – Złotoryja County	CAL – Aleksandrów County; CB – Bydgoszcz (city county); CBR – Brodnica County; CBY – Bydgoszcz County; CCH – Chełmno County; CG – Grudziądz (city county); CGD – Golub-Dobrzyń County; CGR – Grudziądz County; CIN – Inowrocław County; CLI – Lipno County; CMG – Mogilno County; CNA – Nakło County; CRA – Radziejów County; CRY – Rypin County; CSE – Sępólno County; CSW – Świecie County; CT – Toruń (city county); CTR – Toruń County; CTU – Tuchola County; CW – Włocławek (city county); CWA – Wąbrzeźno County; CWL – Włocławek County; CZN – Żnin County	EBE – Bełchatów County; EBR – Brzeziny County; EKU – Kutno County; EL, ED – Łódź (city county); ELA – Łask County; ELC – Łowicz County; ELE – Łęczyca County; ELW – Łódź East County; EOP – Opoczno County; EP – Piotrków Trybunalski (city county); EPA – Pabianice County; EPD – Poddębice County; EPI – Piotrków County; EPJ – Pajęczno County; ERA – Radomsko County; ERW – Rawa County; ES – Skierniewice (city county); ESI – Sieradz County; ESK – Skierniewice County; ETM – Tomaszów County; EWE – Wieruszów County; EWI – Wieluń County; EZD – Zduńska Wola County; EZG – Zgierz County	LB – Biała Podlaska (city county); LBI – Biała County; LBL – Biłgoraj County; LC – Chełm (city county); LCH – Chełm County; LHR – Hrubieszów County; LJA – Janów County; LKR – Kraśnik County; LKS – Krasnystaw County; LLB – Lubartów County; LLE – Łęczna County; LLU – Łuków County; LOP – Opole County; LPA – Parczew County; LPU – Puławy County; LRA – Radzyń County; LRY – Ryki County; LSW – Świdnik County; LTM – Tomaszów County; LU – Lublin (city county); LUB – Lublin County; LWL – Włodawa County; LZ – Zamość (city county); LZA – Zamość County
Lubusz Voivodeship	Lesser Poland Voivodeship	Masovian Voivodeship (incl. Warsaw)	Opole Voivodeship
FG – Gorzów Wielkopolski (city county); FGW – Gorzów County; FKR – Krosno County; FMI – Międzyrzecz County; FNW – Nowa Sól County; FSD – Strzelce-Drezdenko County; FSL - Słubice County; FSU – Sulęcin County; FSW – Świebodzin County; FWS – Wschowa County; FZ – Zielona Góra (city county); FZA – Żary County; FZG – Żagań County; FZI – Zielona Góra County	KBC – Bochnia County; KBR – Brzesko County; KCH – Chrzanów County; KDA – Dąbrowa County; KGR – Gorlice County; KLI – Limanowa County; KMI – Miechów County; KMY – Myślenice County; KN – Nowy Sącz (city county); KNS – Nowy Sącz County; KNT – Nowy Targ County; KOL – Olkusz County; KOS – Oświęcim County; KPR – Proszowice County; KR, KK, JR – Kraków (city county); KRA – Kraków County; KSU – Sucha County; KT – Tarnów (city county); KTA – Tarnów County; KTT – Tatra County; KWA – Wadowice County; KWI – Wieliczka County	WA – Warsaw (Białołęka district); WB – Warsaw (Bemowo district); WBR – Białobrzegi County; WCI – Ciechanów County; WD – Warsaw (Bielany district); WE, AE – Warsaw (Mokotów district); WF – Warsaw (Praga-Południe district); WG – Garwolin County; WGM – Grodzisk County; WGR – Grójec County; WGS – Gostynin County; WH – Warsaw (Praga-Północ district); WI – Warsaw (Śródmieście district); WJ – Warsaw (Targówek district); WK – Warsaw (Ursus district); WKZ – Kozienice County; WL – Legionowo County; WLI – Lipsko County; WLS – Łosice County; WM – Mińsk County; WMA – Maków County; WML – Mława County; WN – Warsaw (Ursynów district); WND – Nowy Dwór County; WO – Ostrołęka (city county); WOR – Ostrów County; WOS – Ostrołęka County; WOT – Otwock County; WP – Płock (city county); WPI – Piaseczno County; WPL – Płock County; WPN – Płońsk County; WPR – Pruszków County; WPU – Pułtusk County; WPY – Przysucha County; WPZ – Przasnysz County; WR – Radom (city county); WRA – Radom County; WS – Siedlce (city county); WSC – Sochaczew County; WSE – Sierpc County; WSI – Siedlce County; WSK – Sokołów County; WSZ – Szydłowiec County; WT – Warsaw (Wawer district); WU – Warsaw (Ochota district); WW ****(last K, L, M, N, V, R, S) – Warsaw (Włochy district); WW ****(last F, G, H, J, W) – Warsaw (Wilanów district); WW ****(last A, C, E, X, Y) – Warsaw (Rembertów district); WWE – Węgrów County; WWL, WV – Wołomin County; WWY – Wyszków County; WX – Warsaw (Żoliborz district); WX ***Y# – Warsaw (Wesoła district); WY – Warsaw (Wola district); WZ – Warsaw West County; WZU – Żuromin County; WZW – Zwoleń County; WZY – Żyrardów County	OB – Brzeg County; OGL – Głubczyce County; OK – Kędzierzyn-Koźle County; OKL – Kluczbork County; OKR – Krapkowice County; ONA – Namysłów County; ONY – Nysa County; OOL – Olesno County; OP – Opole (city county); OPO – Opole County; OPR – Prudnik County; OST – Strzelce County
Podkarpackie Voivodeship	Podlaskie Voivodeship	Pomeranian Voivodeship	Silesian Voivodeship
RBI – Bieszczady County; RBR – Brzozów County; RDE – Dębica County; RJA – Jarosław County; RJS – Jasło County; RK – Krosno (city county); RKL – Kolbuszowa County; RKR – Krosno County; RLA – Łańcut County; RLE – Leżajsk County; RLS – Lesko County; RLU – Lubaczów County; RMI – Mielec County; RNI – Nisko County; RP – Przemyśl (city county); RPR – Przemyśl County; RPZ – Przeworsk County; RRS – Ropczyce-Sędziszów County; RSA – Sanok County; RSR – Strzyżów County; RST – Stalowa Wola County; RT – Tarnobrzeg (city county); RTA – Tarnobrzeg County; RZ, YZ – Rzeszów (city county); RZE – Rzeszów County	BAU – Augustów County; BBI – Bielsk County; BGR – Grajewo County; BHA – Hajnówka County; BI – Białystok (city county); BIA – Białystok County; BKL – Kolno County; BL – Łomża (city county); BLM – Łomża County; BMN – Monki County; BS – Suwałki (city county); BSE – Sejny County; BSI – Siemiatycze County; BSK – Sokółka County; BSU – Suwałki County; BWM – Wysokie Mazowieckie County; BZA – Zambrów County	GA – Gdynia (city county); GBY – Bytów County; GCH – Chojnice County; GCZ – Człuchów County; GD, XD – Gdańsk (city county); GDA – Gdańsk County; GKA – Kartuzy County; GKS – Kościerzyna County; GKW – Kwidzyn County; GLE – Lębork County; GMB – Malbork County; GND – Nowy Dwór County; GPU – Puck County; GS – Słupsk (city county); GSL – Słupsk County; GSP – Sopot (city county); GST – Starogard County; GSZ – Sztum County; GTC – Tczew County; GWE – Wejherowo County	SB – Bielsko-Biała (city county); SBE – Będzin County; SBI – Bielsko County; SBL – Bieruń-Lędziny County; SC – Częstochowa (city county); SCI – Cieszyn County; SCZ – Częstochowa County; SD – Dąbrowa Górnicza (city county); SG – Gliwice (city county); SGL – Gliwice County; SH – Chorzów (city county); SI – Siemianowice Śląskie (city county); SJ – Jaworzno (city county); SJZ – Jastrzębie-Zdrój (city county); SK, IK – Katowice (city county); SKL – Kłobuck County; SL – Ruda Śląska (city county); SLU – Lubliniec County; SM – Mysłowice (city county); SMI – Mikołów County; SMY – Myszków County; SO – Sosnowiec (city county); SPI – Piekary Śląskie (city county); SPS – Pszczyna County; SR – Rybnik (city county); SRB – Rybnik County; SRC – Racibórz County; SRS – Ruda Śląska (city county); ST – Tychy (city county); STA – Tarnowskie Góry County; STY – Tychy County; SW – Świętochłowice (city county); SWD – Wodzisław County; SY – Bytom (city county); SZ – Zabrze (city county); SZA – Zawiercie County; SZO – Żory (city county); SZY – Żywiec County
Świętokrzyskie Voivodeship	Warmian-Masurian Voivodeship	Greater Poland Voivodeship	West Pomeranian Voivodeship
TBU – Busko County; TJE – Jędrzejów County; TK – Kielce (city county); TKA – Kazimierza Wielka County; TKI – Kielce County; TKN – Końskie County; TLW – Włoszczowa County; TOP – Opatów County; TOS – Ostrowiec County; TPI – Pińczów County; TSA – Sandomierz County; TSK – Skarżysko County; TST – Starachowice County; TSZ – Staszów County	NBA – Bartoszyce County; NBR – Braniewo County; NDZ – Działdowo County; NE – Elbląg (city county); NEB – Elbląg County; NEL – Ełk County; NGI – Giżycko County; NGO – Gołdap County; NIL – Iława County; NKE – Kętrzyn County; NLI – Lidzbark County; NMR – Mrągowo County; NNI – Nidzica County; NNM – Nowe Miasto County; NO – Olsztyn (city county); NOE – Olecko County; NOG – former Olecko-Gołdap County (Powiat olecko-gołdapski): divided into Olecko County (NOE) and Gołdap County (NGO) in 2002; NOL – Olsztyn County; NOS – Ostróda County; NPI – Pisz County; NSZ – Szczytno County; NWE – Węgorzewo County	PCH – Chodzież County; PCT - Czarnków–Trzcianka County; PGN – Gniezno County; PGO – Grodzisk County; PGS – Gostyń County; PJA – Jarocin County; PK – Kalisz (city county); PKA – Kalisz County; PKE – Kępno County; PKL – Koło County; PKN – Konin County; PKO, PN – Konin (city county); PKR – Krotoszyn County; PKS – Kościan County; PL – Leszno (city county); PLE – Leszno County; PMI – Międzychód County; PNT – Nowy Tomyśl County; PO, PY, MO – Poznań (city county); POB – Oborniki County; POS – Ostrów County; POT – Ostrzeszów County; POZ, PZ – Poznań County; PP – Piła County; PPL – Pleszew County; PRA – Rawicz County; PSE – Śrem County; PSL – Słupca County; PSR – Środa County; PSZ – Szamotuły County; PTU – Turek County; PWA – Wągrowiec County; PWL – Wolsztyn County; PWR – Września County; PZ – Poznań County; PZL – Złotów County	ZBI – Białogard County; ZCH – Choszczno County; ZDR – Drawsko County; ZGL – Goleniów County; ZGR – Gryfino County; ZGY – Gryfice County; ZK – Koszalin (city county); ZKA – Kamień County; ZKL – Kołobrzeg County; ZKO – Koszalin County; ZLO – Łobez County; ZMY – Myślibórz County; ZPL – Police County; ZPY – Pyrzyce County; ZS – Szczecin (city county); ZSD – Świdwin County; ZSL – Sławno County; ZST – Stargard County; ZSW – Świnoujście (city county); ZSZ – Szczecinek County; ZWA – Wałcz County

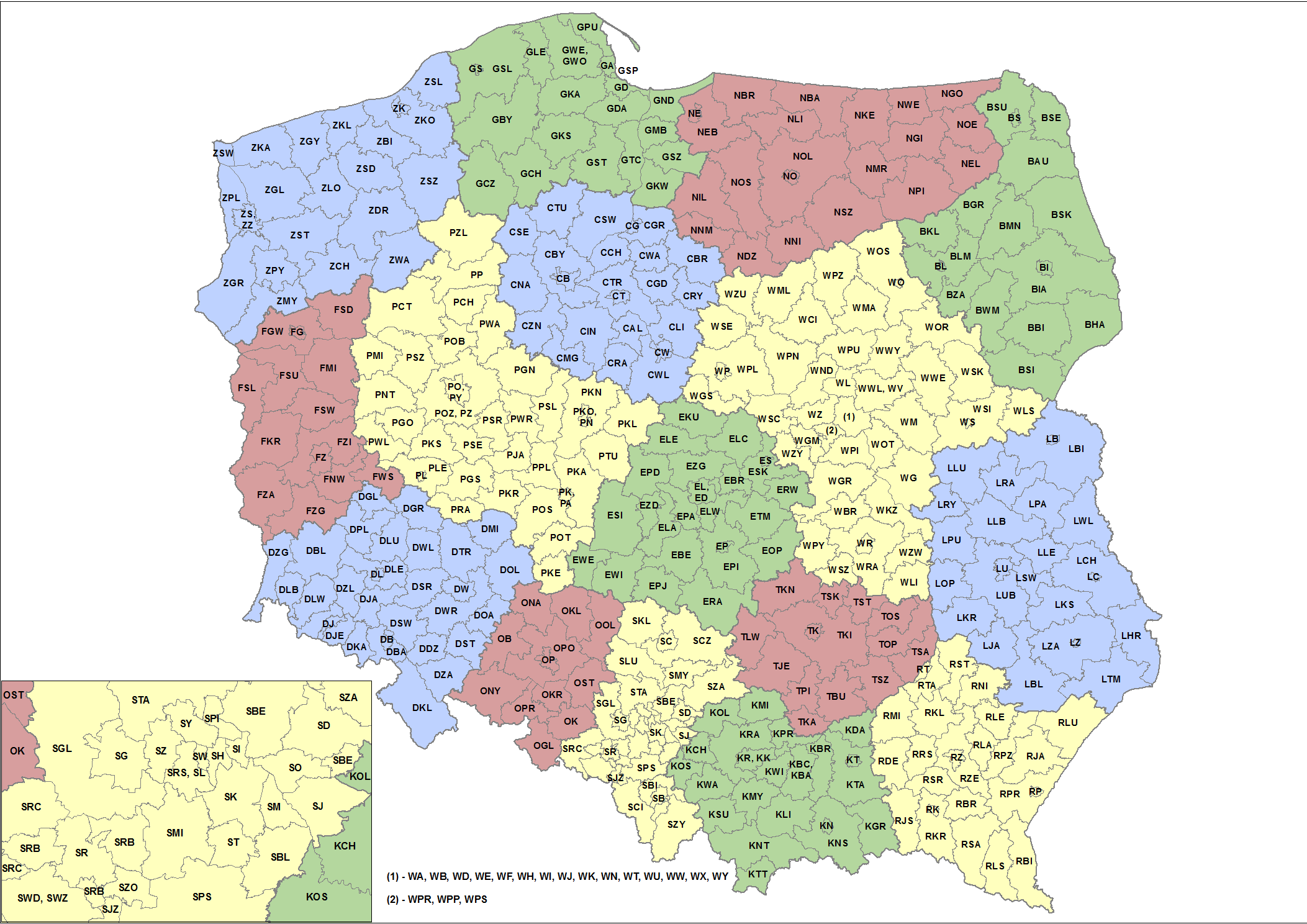
Letters on Polish license plates according to districts County

== History ==
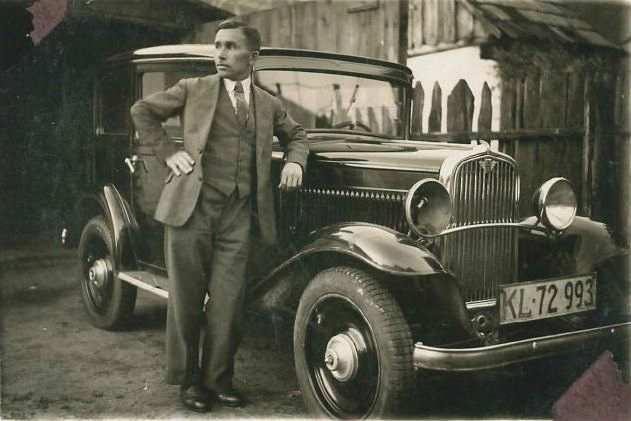
Polski Fiat 508 with 1922–1937 numbers (Kielce voivodeship)

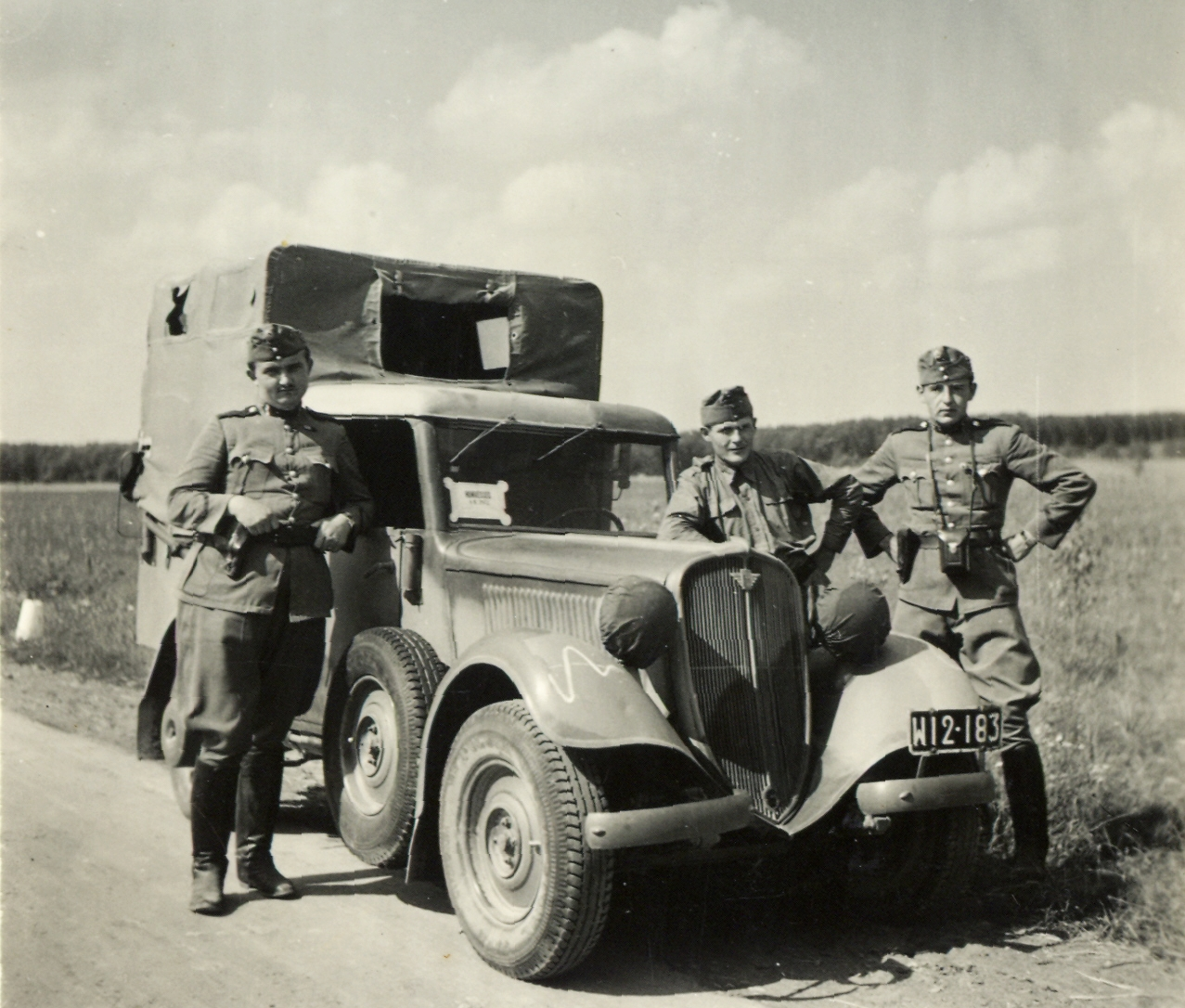
Polski Fiat 508/518 with 1937 military plates

=== 1922–1937 ===
From July 1922 Polish car number plates had two letters denoting voivodeship (being an abbreviation of its name), or single letter W denoting capital city of Warsaw, and up to five digits. Except for letter identifier, each voivodeship had own range of numbers (except for autonomic Silesian Voivodeship, which used ŚL identifier and own numbers from 1). Plates were white, with red letters and black digits, separated with red dash.

There were also temporary plates with PR letters and presidential plates with WZK letters (for President of Poland chancellery). Military plates had only four white digits on black background.

=== 1937–1939 ===
From 1937 there was a new different system of registration numbers introduced, with white letters on black plates. There was one letter denoting vehicle type, two-digit number denoting voivodeship, and three-digit individual number after a dash. Letters A, B, C, D, E, H, K, L, X, Y, Z were used for cars, trucks and buses, T for taxicabs, M, N, P, R, S, U for motorcycles and W for military vehicles. A range of numbers 00 to 19 meant capital city of Warsaw, 20 to 24 indicated Białostok Voivodeship, and so on, in alphabetical order, up to 95 to 99 for Wołyńskie Voivodeship.

During World War II there were plates introduced by occupants.

=== 1944–1956 ===
From 1946 Polish car number plates had the LNN-NNN format, with L being a letter and N being a digit. The full name of the province was located at the bottom.

=== 1956–1976 ===
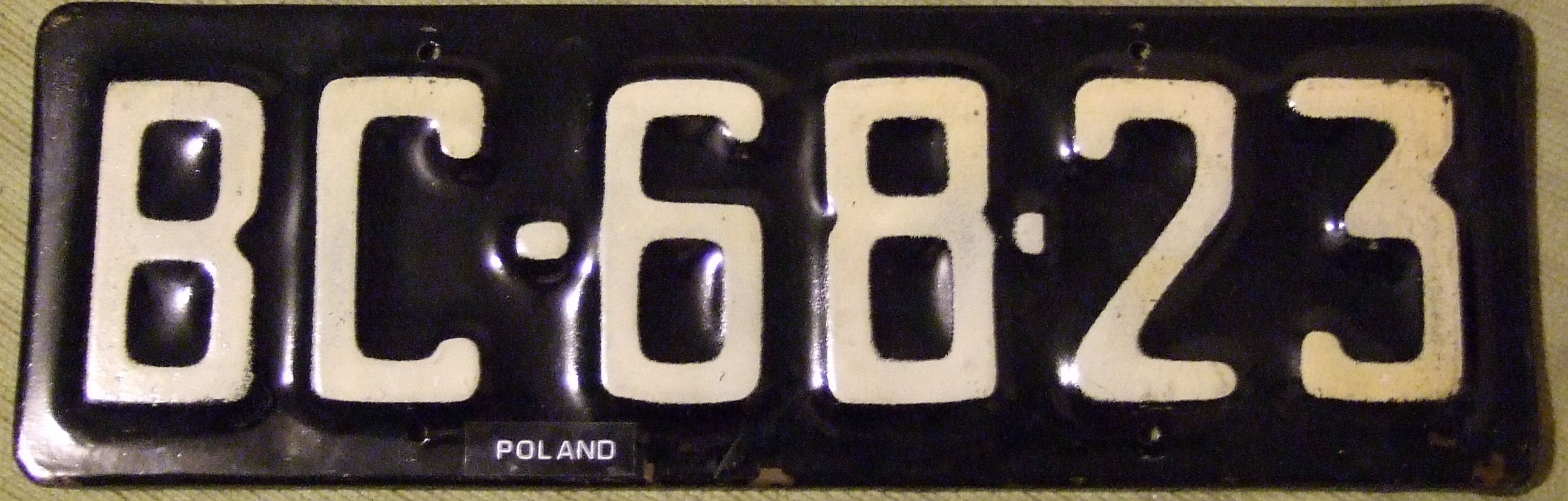
1958 plate from Białystok Voivodeship

From June 19, 1956, Polish car number plates had 2 letters and 4 digits, and after May 13, 1964, letters could stand after digits.

Individual elements meant:

- first letter: code of voivodeship,
- second letter: code of powiat,
- digits: code of vehicle.

Codes of voivodeships:

- A – Białystok Voivodeship
- B – Bydgoszcz Voivodeship
- C – Kielce Voivodeship
- E – Koszalin Voivodeship
- F – Łódź Voivodeship
- G – Gdańsk Voivodeship
- H – Opole Voivodeship
- I – city of Łódź
- K – Kraków Voivodeship
- L – Lublin Voivodeship
- M – Szczecin Voivodeship
- O – Olsztyn Voivodeship
- P – Poznań Voivodeship
- R – Rzeszów Voivodeship
- S – Katowice Voivodeship
- T – Warsaw Voivodeship
- W – capital city of Warsaw
- X – Wrocław Voivodeship
- Z – Zielona Góra Voivodeship

Codes of special forces:

- Y – Citizen's Militia
- D – army (cars)
- U – army (other vehicles)
- N – Border Guard

=== 1976–2000 ===
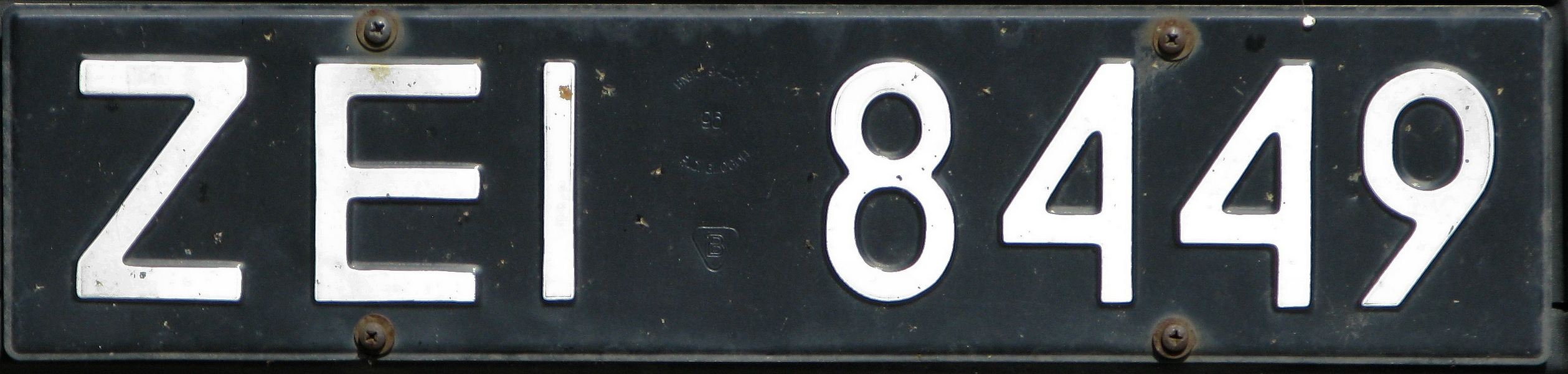
1990s plate. "ZE" indicates Zielona Góra Voivodeship, while the "I" indicates Nowa Sól County

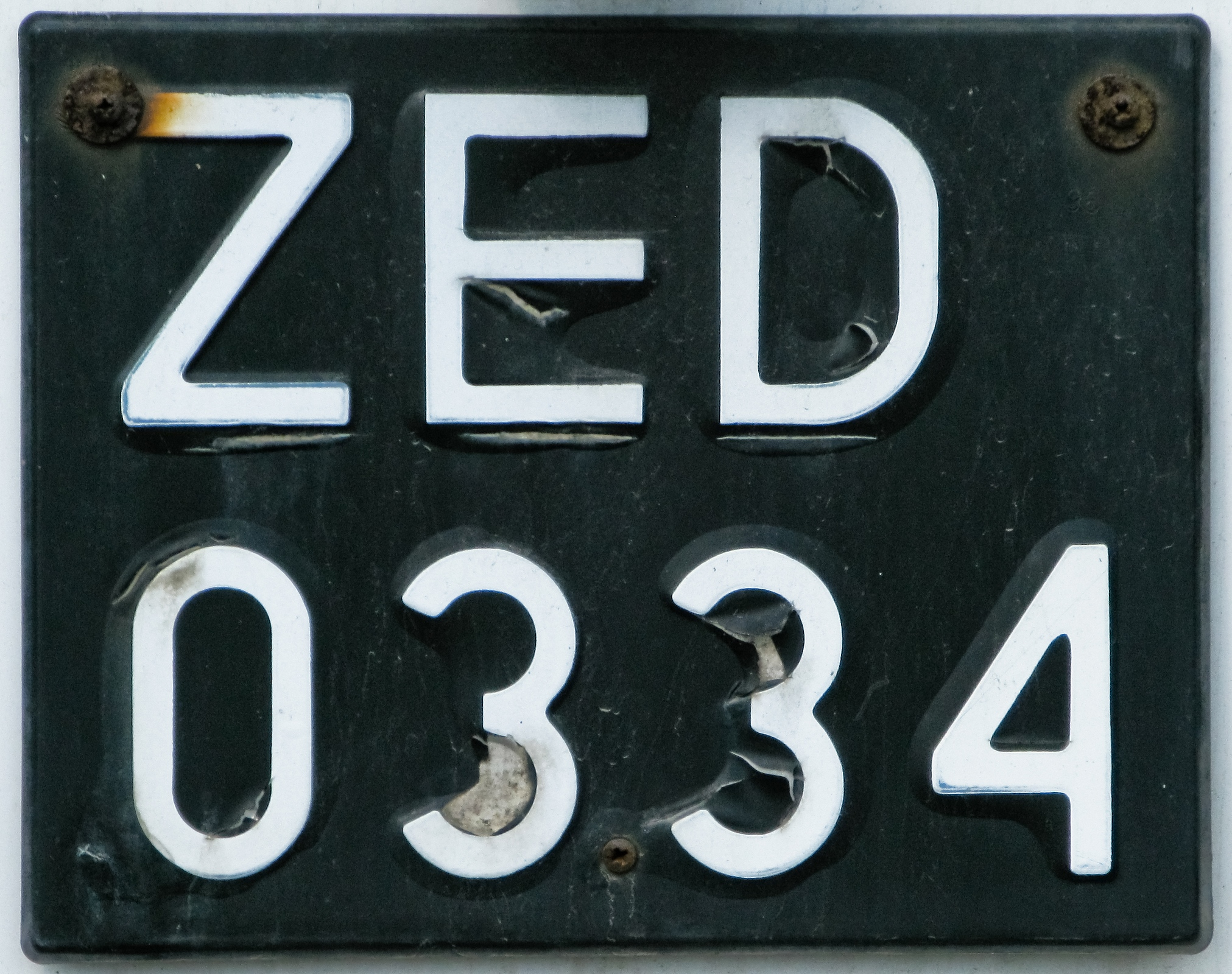
1990s double-row plate. "ZE" indicates Zielona Góra Voivodeship, while the "D" and number between 0001 and 7000 indicates Zielona Góra

Plates from the 1976–2000 series are still valid. They have white letters on black background. The coding used was three letters and four digits (XYZ 1234) or three letters, three digits and one letter (XYZ 123A), although at the beginning the configuration with a letter in the end was used for state owned cars only.

The following coding was used for the 49 regions of the country:

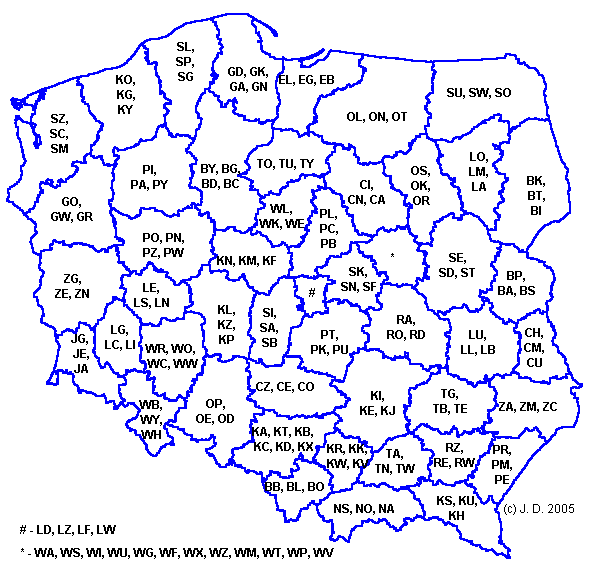
First letters on series 1976–2000 indicate area

- Biała Podlaska: BP, BA, BS
- Białystok: BK, BT, BI
- Bielsko-Biała: BB, BL, BO
- Bydgoszcz: BY, BG, BD, BC
- Chełm: CH, CM, CU
- Ciechanów: CI, CN, CA
- Częstochowa: CZ, CE, CO
- Elbląg: EL, EG, EB
- Gdańsk: GD, GK, GA, GN
- Gorzów Wlkp.: GO, GW, GR
- Jelenia Góra: JG, JE, JA
- Kalisz: KL, KZ, KP
- Katowice: KA, KT, KB, KC, KD, KX
- Kielce: KI, KE, KJ
- Konin: KN, KM, KF
- Koszalin: KO, KG, KY
- Kraków (Cracow): KR, KK, KW, KV
- Krosno: KS, KU, KH
- Legnica: LG, LC, LI
- Leszno: LE, LS, LN
- Lublin: LU, LL, LB
- Łomża: LO, LM, LA
- Łódź: LD, LZ, LF, LW
- Nowy Sącz: NS, NO, NA
- Olsztyn: OL, ON, OT
- Opole: OP, OE, OD
- Ostrołęka: OS, OK, OR
- Piła: PI, PA, PY
- Piotrków Tryb.: PT, PK, PU
- Płock: PL, PC, PB
- Poznań: PO, PN, PZ, PW
- Przemyśl: PR, PM, PE
- Radom: RA, RO, RD
- Rzeszów: RZ, RE, RW
- Siedlce: SE, SD, ST
- Sieradz: SI, SA, SB
- Skierniewice: SK, SN, SF
- Słupsk: SL, SP, SG
- Suwałki: SU, SW, SO
- Szczecin: SZ, SC, SM
- Tarnobrzeg: TG, TB, TE
- Tarnów: TA, TN, TW
- Toruń: TO, TU, TY
- Wałbrzych: WB, WY, WH
- Warsaw: WA, WS, WI, WU, WG, WF, WX, WZ, WM, WT, WP, WV
- Włocławek: WL, WK, WE
- Wrocław: WR, WO, WC, WW
- Zamość: ZA, ZM, ZC
- Zielona Góra: ZG, ZE, ZN

The following codes were used for special forces:

- Militia/Police: MO
- Military: U
- Border Guard: HW
- "Nadwislanskie" Troops of the Interior Ministry: HN
- Foreigner plates (in green background): I
- Test plates (in red background): X

Special plates:

- Diplomatic: XY 12 345, The first two numbers are denoting the region of ambassador (e.g. 02 - Germany) and blue background.
- Temporary: X 12 34 56, with yellow font.

=== 2000–present ===
Since the year 2000 Polish car plates have black letters pressed onto white reflective blanks with an EU stripe and country code. The switch was made to conform with other EU countries and to increase visibility. The licence plates issued until May 1, 2006, bear a Polish national flag. Plates issued after that date have the 12 EU stars instead of the Polish flag.

== See also ==
- European license plates
