= Lease =

Contract to use an asset by paying the owner

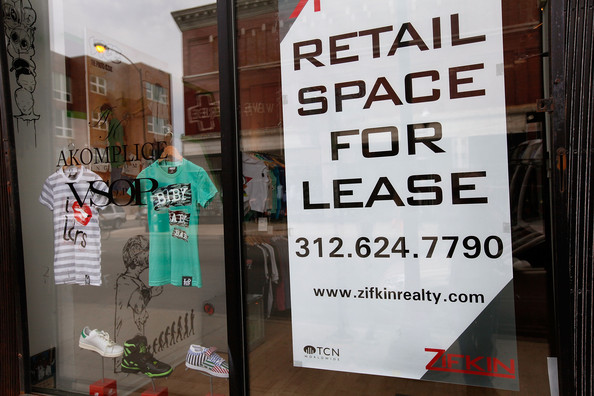
A sign in Chicago offering space for lease

A lease is a contractual arrangement calling for the user (referred to as the lessee) to pay the owner (referred to as the lessor) for the use of an asset. Property, buildings and vehicles are common assets that are leased. Industrial or business equipment are also leased. In essence, a lease agreement is a contract between two parties: the lessor and the lessee. The lessor is the legal owner of the asset, while the lessee obtains the right to use the asset in return for regular rental payments. The lessee also agrees to abide by various conditions regarding their use of the property or equipment. For example, a person leasing a car may agree to the condition that the car will only be used for personal use.

The term rental agreement can refer to two kinds of leases:

- A lease in which the asset is tangible property. Here, the user rents the asset (e.g. land or goods) let out or rented out by the owner (the verb to lease is less precise because it can refer to either of these actions). Examples of a lease for intangible property include use of a computer program (similar to a license, but with different provisions), or use of a radio frequency (such as a contract with a cell-phone provider).
- A periodic lease agreement (most often a month-to-month lease) internationally and in some regions of the United States.

== General terms ==
A lease is a legal contract, and thus enforceable by all parties under the contract law of the applicable jurisdiction. Some kinds of leases may have specific clauses required by statute depending upon the property being leased, the jurisdiction in which the agreement was signed, and the residence of the parties.

Common elements of a lease agreement include:

- Names of the parties of the agreement.
- The starting date and duration of the agreement.
- Identifies the specific object (by street address, VIN, or make/model, serial number) being leased.
- Provides conditions for renewal or non-renewal.
- Has a specific consideration (a lump sum, or periodic payments) for granting the use of this object.
- Has provisions for a security deposit and terms for its return.
- May have a specific list of conditions which are therein described as Default Conditions and specific Remedies.
- May have other specific conditions placed upon the parties such as:
  - Need to provide insurance for loss.
  - Restrictive use.
  - Which party is responsible for maintenance.
- Termination clause (describing what will happen if the contract is ended early or cancelled by either of the parties, stating the rights of parties to terminate the lease, and their obligations)

All kinds of personal property (e.g. cars and furniture) or real property (e.g. raw land, apartments, single family homes, and business property, which includes wholesale and retail) may be leased. As a result of the lease, the owner (lessor) grants the use of the stated property to the lessee.

== Leases of land ==
The narrower term 'tenancy' describes a lease in which the tangible property is land (including at any vertical section such as airspace, storey of building or mine). A premium is an amount paid by the tenant for the lease to be granted or to secure the former tenant's lease, often in order to secure a low rent, in long leases termed a ground rent. For parts of buildings it is most common for users to pay also by collateral contract, or by the same contract, a service charge which is normally an express list of services in a lease to minimize disputes over service charges. A gross lease or tenancy stipulates a rent that is for the global amount due including all service charges.

A cancelable lease (UK: determinable/breakable lease) is a lease that may be terminated (formally determined) solely by the lessee or solely by the lessor without penalty. A mutually determinable lease can be determined by either. A non-cancelable lease is a lease that cannot be so terminated. Commonly, "lease" may imply a non-cancelable lease, whereas "rental agreement" may connote a cancelable lease.

Influenced by land registration, commonly tenancies initially granted for more than a year are referred to more simply as leases.

The lease will either provide specific provisions regarding the responsibilities and rights of the lessee and lessor, or there will be automatic provisions as a result of local law. In general, by paying the negotiated fee to the lessor, the lessee (also called a tenant) has possession and use (the rental) of the leased property to the exclusion of the lessor and all others except with the invitation of the tenant. The most common form of real property lease is a residential rental agreement between landlord and tenant. As the relationship between the tenant and the landlord is called a tenancy, this term generally is also used for informal and shorter leases. The right to possession by the tenant is sometimes called a leasehold interest. A lease can be for a fixed period of time (called the term of the lease). A lease may be terminated sooner than its end date by:

- Break/cancellation (this depends upon the terms of the lease)
- A negotiated deed of surrender or yielding-up.
- Forfeiture
- By operation of statute (rare)

A lease should be contrasted with a license, which may entitle a person (called a licensee) to use property, but which is subject to termination at the will of the owner of the property (called the licensor). An example of a licensor/licensee relationship is a parking lot owner and a person who parks a vehicle in the parking lot. A license may be seen in the form of a ticket to a baseball game or a verbal permission to sleep a few days on a sofa. The difference is that if there is a term (end time), a degree of privacy suggestive of exclusive possession of a clearly defined part, practised ongoing, recurrent payments, a lack of right to terminate save for misconduct or nonpayment, these factors tend toward a lease; by contrast, a one-time entrance onto someone else's property is probably a license. The seminal difference between a lease and a license is that a lease generally provides for regular periodic payments during its term and a specific ending date. If a contract has no ending date then it may be in the form of a perpetual license and still not be a lease.

Under normal circumstances, owners of property are at liberty to do what they want with their property (for a lawful purpose), including dealing with it or handing over possession of the property to a tenant for a limited period of time. If an owner has granted possession to another (i.e., the tenant) then any interference with the quiet enjoyment of the property by the tenant in lawful possession is itself unlawful.

Similar principles apply to real property as well as to personal property, though the terminology differs. The right to sub-lease may or may not be permitted to a tenant. Where it is permitted, the lease granted directly by the owner is called a "headlease", or sometimes a "master lease". Headlease tenants and their tenants who may in turn also sublet are termed mesne /miːn/ landlords from the old French for middle. The headlease tenant has no right to grant a sublease which extends beyond the end of the headlease.

To circumvent privity of estate which is the general principle flowing from privity of contract, laws exist in several jurisdictions to bind subtenants to some of the restrictive covenants (terms) of the headlease, for instance in England and Wales those which have been held by courts to touch and concern the land.

A transfer of a remaining interest in a lease, assignment, is a type of (alienation) is often possible and an implied rights to assign exist by compulsory law or as a default position in some jurisdictions. Sharing or parting with possession can be a breach of certain leases resulting in action for forfeiture.

Enfranchisement is the obtaining of the landlord's title and is most commonly negotiated with the landlord where a tenant pays only a ground rent. Merger is where the landlord and tenant happen to be the same and can terminate a lease where there are no subtenants in certain jurisdictions.

In the United States a lessee may negotiate a right of first refusal clause into their land or property lease giving them the right to make a purchase offer on the property before the lessor can negotiate with third-party buyers. This gives tenants the ability to commit to a piece of property before any other potential buyers have the opportunity.

== History of leases of land ==
Over the centuries, leases have served many purposes and the nature of legal regulation has varied according to those purposes and the social and economic conditions of the times. Leases, for example, were mainly used for agricultural purposes until the late 18th century and early 19th century when the growth of cities in industrialized countries made leases an important form of landholding in urban areas.

The modern law of landlord and tenant in common law jurisdictions retains the influence of the common law and, particularly, the laissez-faire philosophy that dominated the law of contract and property law in the 19th century. With the growth of consumerism, consumer protection legislation recognized that common law principles, which assume equal bargaining power between the contracting parties, create hardships when that assumption is inaccurate. Consequently, reformers have emphasized the need to assess residential tenancy laws in terms of protection they provide to tenants. Legislation to protect tenants is now common. Consequently, Common law has treated Lease as not similar or equivalent to a common commercial contract, especially in regard to the question of whether a Lease Agreement can be terminated by notice, in the same way and manner as a usual commercial contract.

== Types of tenancies ==
=== Fixed-term tenancy or tenancy for years ===
A fixed-term tenancy or tenancy for years lasts for some fixed period of time. It has a definite beginning date and a definite ending date. Despite the name "tenancy for years", such a tenancy can last for any period of time—even a tenancy for one week may be called a tenancy for years. At common law the duration did not need to be certain, but could be conditioned upon the happening of some event, (e.g., "until the crops are ready for harvest" or "until the war is over"). In many jurisdictions that possibility has been partially or totally abolished.

A fixed term tenancy comes to an end automatically when the fixed term runs out or, in the case of a tenancy that ends on the happening of an event, when the event occurs. If a holdover tenant remains on the property after the termination of the lease, s/he may become a tenant at sufferance because the lessor/landlord has suffered (or allowed) the tenant to remain as a tenant instead of evicting him or her. Such a tenancy is generally "at will," meaning the tenant or the landlord may terminate it at any time, upon the providing of proper statutory notice.

=== Periodic tenancy ===
A periodic tenancy, also known as a tenancy from year to year, month to month, or week to week, is an estate that exists for some period of time determined by the term of the payment of rent. An oral lease for a tenancy of years that violates the Statute of Frauds (by committing to a lease of more than one year—depending on the jurisdiction—without being in writing) may actually create a periodic tenancy, depending on the laws of the jurisdiction where the leased premises are located. In many jurisdictions the "default" tenancy, where the parties have not explicitly specified a different arrangement, and where none is presumed under local or business custom, is a month-to-month tenancy.

Either the landlord or the tenant may terminate a periodic tenancy when the period or term is nearing completion, by giving notice to the other party as required by statute or case law in the jurisdiction. Neither landlord nor tenant may terminate a periodic tenancy before the period has ended, without incurring an obligation to pay for the months remaining on the lease. Either party must give notice if it intends to terminate a tenancy from year to year, and the amount of notice is either specified by the lease or by state statute. Notice is usually, but not always, at least one month, especially for the year-to-year periodic tenancy. Durations of less than a year must typically receive notice equal to the period of the tenancy—for example, the landlord must give a month's notice to terminate a tenancy from month to month. However, many jurisdictions have increased these required notice periods, and some have reduced the capacity of a landlord to use them drastically. For jurisdictions that have local rent control laws, a landlord's ability to terminate a residential tenancy is substantially reduced. For example, in California, the cities of Los Angeles, Santa Monica, West Hollywood, San Francisco, and Oakland have "rent stabilization ordinances" that limit a landlord's ability to terminate a periodic tenancy, among other restrictions.

The notice must also state the effective date of termination, which, in some jurisdictions, must be on the last day of the payment period. In other words, if a month-to-month tenancy began on the 15th of the month, in a jurisdiction with a last day requirement the termination could not be effective on the 20th of the following month, even though this would give the tenant more than the required one month's notice.

=== Tenancy at will ===
A tenancy at will is a tenancy which either the landlord or the tenant may terminate at any time by giving reasonable notice. Unlike a periodic tenancy, it isn't associated with a time period. It may last for many years, but it could be ended at any time by either the lessor or the lessee for any reason, or for no reason at all. Proper notice, as always with landlord/tenant law, must be given, as set forth in the state's statutes. If there is no formal lease, the tenancy at will is the one that usually exists. In rare cases it may occur where the tenancy is not for consideration. Under the modern common law, a tenancy at will without compensation is very rare, partly because it comes about only if the parties expressly agree that the tenancy is for no rent, commonly where a family member is allowed to live in a home (a nominal consideration may be required) without any formal arrangements. In most residential tenancies for a fixed term, for consideration, the tenant may not be removed except for cause, even if there is no written lease. (However, an oral lease for more than 12 months is not enforceable if the statute of frauds in the jurisdiction includes leases of more than 12 months.) Many residential leases convert to "at will" tenancy subject to 30 days' notice. Alternatively, a tenancy at will (without a specific time limit) may exist for a temporary period where a tenant wishes to take possession of a property and the landlord agrees, but there is insufficient time in which to negotiate and complete a new lease. In this case, the tenancy at will is terminated as soon as a new lease is negotiated and signed. The parties may also agree on the basis that if the parties fail to enter into a new lease within a reasonable time period, then the tenant must vacate the premises.

If a lease exists at the sole discretion of the landlord, the law of the jurisdiction may imply that the tenant is granted, by operation of law, a reciprocal right to terminate the lease at will. However, a lease that explicitly exists at the will of the tenant (e.g. "for as long as the tenant desires to live on this land") generally does not imply that the landlord may terminate the lease; rather, such language may be interpreted as granting the tenant a life estate or even a fee simple.

A tenancy at will is broken, again by operation of law, if the:

- Tenant commits waste against the property;
- Tenant attempts to assign the tenancy;
- Tenant uses the property to operate a criminal enterprise;
- Landlord transfers his/her interest in the property;
- Landlord leases the property to another person;
- Tenant or landlord dies.

The specifics of these rules differ from jurisdiction to jurisdiction.

Subject to any notice required by law, a tenancy at will also comes to an end when either the landlord or the tenant acts inconsistently with a tenancy. For example, the changing of locks by the landlord is an indication of the end of the tenancy, as is the vacation of the premises by the tenant. However, in some jurisdictions, such as California, a landlord is prohibited from using a "self help" remedy, such as changing the locks, to terminate a tenancy, particularly a residential tenancy. Doing so may constitute a "constructive eviction" and expose the landlord to civil and criminal liability.

=== Tenancy at sufferance ===
A tenancy at sufferance (sometimes called a holdover tenancy) exists when a tenant remains in possession of a property after the expiration of a lease, and until the landlord acts to eject the tenant from the property. Although the tenant is technically a trespasser at this point, and possession of this type is not a true estate in land, authorities recognize the condition in order to hold the tenant liable for rent. The landlord may evict such a tenant at any time, and without notice.

The landlord may also impose a new lease on the holdover tenant. For a residential tenancy, this new tenancy is month to month. For a commercial tenancy of more than a year, the new tenancy is year to year; otherwise it is the same period as the period before the original lease expired. In either case, the landlord can raise the rent, so long as the landlord has told the tenant of the higher rent before the expiration of the original lease.

== Formalities ==
Formal requirements for a lease are determined by the law and custom of the jurisdiction in which real property is located. In the case of personal property, it is determined by the law and custom of the jurisdiction in which the rental agreement is made.

A tenancy for a duration greater than one year must be in writing in order to satisfy the Statute of Frauds.

=== Term ===
The term of the lease may be fixed, periodic or of indefinite duration. If it is for a specified period of time, the term ends automatically when the period expires, and no notice needs to be given, in the absence of legal requirements. The term's duration may be conditional, in which case it lasts until a specified event occurs, such as the death of a specified individual. A periodic tenancy is one which is renewed automatically, usually on a monthly or weekly basis. A tenancy at will lasts only as long as the parties wish it to, and may be terminated by either party without penalty.

It is common for a lease to be extended on a "holding over" basis, which normally converts the tenancy to a periodic tenancy on a month by month basis. It is also possible for a tenant, either expressly or impliedly, to give up the tenancy to the landlord. This process is known as a "surrender" of the lease.

There have been recent restrictions and limitations in New York City regarding lease terms. One limitation in particular stated that units can not be leased for a period of less than two weeks and any unit leased for less than 90 days may not allow guests or pets in the unit.

=== Transparency and fine print ===
As stated by the Australian Consumer Law (ACL), 2013, a lack of transparency regarding a term in a standard-form consumer contract may cause a significant imbalance in the parties' rights and obligations.

A term is considered transparent if it is:

- expressed in reasonably plain language
- legible
- presented clearly
- readily available to any party affected by the term

Terms that may not be considered transparent include terms that are hidden in fine print or schedules or phrased in complex or technical language.

=== Rent ===
Rent is a requirement of leases in some common law jurisdictions, but not in civil law jurisdictions. In England and Wales it was held in the case of Ashburn Anstalt v Arnold that rent was not a requirement for there to be a lease, however the court will more often construe a licence where no rent is paid as it is seen as evidence for no intention to create legal relations. There is no requirement for the rent to be a commercial amount; a peppercorn or rent of some nominal amount is sufficient for this requirement.

=== Exclusive possession ===
A sharing arrangement with much of a landlord's property or, for no specific room of a building for instance, may defeat a finding of a lease, however this common requirement of a lease is interpreted differently in many jurisdictions.

== Provisions specific to car rental ==
In addition to the above, a car rental agreement may include various restrictions on the way a renter can use a car, and the condition in which it must be returned. For example, some rentals cannot be driven off-road, or out of the country, or towing a trailer, without specific permission. In New Zealand you may have to specifically endorse a promise that the car will not be driven onto Ninety-Mile Beach (because of the hazardous tides).

There will certainly be a requirement to show a driver's license, and only those drivers appearing on the contract may be authorized to drive. It may include an option to purchase auto insurance (UK: motor insurance), if the renter does not already have a policy to cover rentals—another important consideration for multiple drivers. Some agencies may even require a bond payable if the car is not returned in order, often held in the form of a credit-card authorization—voided if the car is returned per agreement. A renter should be advised that he or she will be responsible for any tolls, parking or traffic violations incurred upon the vehicle during the rental period. There should also be advice on handling thefts, accidents, break-downs, and towing.

Further terms may include added fees for late returns, drop-off at a different location, or failure to top up the petrol immediately before the return.

Finally, there may be provisions for making a non-refundable deposit with a booking, terms for payment of the initial period (with discounts, vouchers, etc.), extended periods, and any damages or other fees that accrue prior to the return.

== Leasing property ==
A rental agreement is often called a lease, especially when real estate is rented. Real estate rentals are initiated by a rental application which is used to build the terms of the lease. In addition to the basics of a rental (who, what, when, how much), a real estate rental may go into much more detail on these and other issues. The real estate may be rented for housing, parking vehicles, storage, business, agricultural, institutional, or government use, or other reasons.

- Who: The parties involved in the contract, the lessor (sometimes called the owner or landlord) and the lessee (sometimes called the renter or tenant) are identified in the contract. A housing lease may specify whether the renter is living alone, with family, children, roommate, visitors. A rental may delineate the rights and obligations of each of these. For example, a "sub-let" to a stranger might not be permitted without permission of the landlord. This also applies to whether or not pets may be kept by the renter. On the other hand, the renter may also have specific rights against intrusions by the landlord (or other tenants), except under emergency circumstances. A renter is in possession of the property, and a landlord would be trespassing upon the renter's rights if entry is made without proper notice and authority (e.g., 24 hours' notice, daytime, knock first, except for emergency repairs, in case of fire, flood, etc.).
- What: Rented real estate may include all or part of almost any real property, such as an apartment, house, building, business offices or suite, land, farm, or merely an inside or outside space to park a vehicle, or store things. The premises rented may include not only specific rooms, but also access to other common areas such as off-street parking, basement or attic storage, laundry facility, pool, roof-deck, balconies, etc. The agreement may specify how and when these places may be used, and by whom. There may be detailed description of the current condition of the premises, for comparison with the condition at the time the premises are surrendered.
- When: the term of the rental may be for a night (e.g., a hotel room), weeks, months, or years. There may be statutory provisions requiring registration of any rental that could extend for more than a specified number of years (e.g., seven) in order to be enforceable against a new landlord.

A typical rental is either annual or month-to-month, and the amount of rent may be different for long-term renters (because of lower turnover costs). Leaving a long-term lease before its expiration could result in penalties, or even the cost of the entire agreed period (if the landlord is unable to find a suitable replacement tenant, after diligent pursuit). If a tenant stays beyond the end of a lease for a term of years (one or more), then the parties may agree that the lease will be automatically renewed, or it may simply convert to a tenancy at will (month-to-month) at the pro-rated monthly cost of the previous annual lease. If a tenant at will is given notice to quit the premises, and refuses to do so, the landlord then begins eviction proceedings. In many places it is completely illegal to change locks on doors, or remove personal belongings, let alone forcibly eject a person, without a court order of eviction. There may be strict rules of procedure, and stiff penalties (triple damages, plus attorneys' fees) for violations.

- How much: Rent may be payable monthly, annually, or in advance, or as otherwise agreed. A typical arrangement for tenancy at will is "first and last month's rent" plus a security deposit. The "last month's rent" is rent that has yet to be earned by the landlord.

In accordance with this, a lease agreement usually includes other critical financial obligations. These factors build upon the basic understanding of rent remittance and are integral to the agreement:

- The overall rent to be paid;
- Potential security or pet deposits;
- The tenant's duty to cover certain utility costs;
- Possible property taxes, if applicable;
- The necessary payment for property insurance;
- Any costs associated with repairs;
- Contributions to the maintenance of communal areas (commonly referred to as CAM).

The agreement may also feature terms that explain circumstances for potential increases in rent, among various other conditions.

=== Deposit ===
The security deposit is often handled as an escrow deposit, owned by the tenant, but held by the landlord until the premises are surrendered in good condition (ordinary wear and tear excepted). In some states, the landlord must provide the tenant with the name and account number of the bank where the security deposit is held, and pay annual interest to the tenant. Other regulations may require the landlord to submit a list of pre-existing damage to the property, or forfeit the security deposit immediately (because there is no way to determine whether a prior tenant was responsible). In UK the government has introduced deposit protection scheme leading to several property inventory services which can optionally be used to carry out an inventory.

=== Insurance ===
In order to rent (alternatively called lease) in many apartment buildings, a renter (lessee) is often required to provide proof of renters insurance before signing the rental agreement. There is a special type of the homeowners insurance in the United States specifically for renters—HO-4. This is commonly referred to as renter's insurance or renter's coverage. Similar to condominium coverage, referred to as a HO-6 policy, a renter's insurance policy covers those aspects of the apartment and its contents not specifically covered in the blanket policy written for the complex. This policy can also cover liabilities arising from accidents and intentional injuries for guests as well as passers-by up to 150' of the domicile. Renter's policies provide "named peril" coverage, meaning the policy states specifically what you are insured against. Common coverage areas are:

- Accidental discharge of water
- Fire or lightning
- Smoke
- Theft
- Vandalism or malicious mischief
- Windstorm

Additional events including riot, aircraft, explosion, hail, falling objects, volcanic eruption, snow, sleet, and weight of ice may also be covered.

== Sublease ==
In real estate law, sublease (or, less formally, sublet) is the name given to an arrangement in which the lessee (e.g. tenant) in a lease assigns the lease to a third party, thereby making the old lessee the sublessor, and the new lessee the sublessee, or subtenant. This means they are not only leasing the property, but also subleasing it simultaneously. For example, if a company leases an office space directly from a landlord, the lessor, and subsequently outgrows the office, then the company can sublease the smaller office space to another company, the subtenant, and enter into a new lease for a larger office space, thereby hedging their real estate exposure.

The sublessor remains liable to the original lessor in accordance with the initial lease, including all remaining rent payments, including operating expenses and all other original lease terms. In a down-market, the original lessee may require a lower rent payment from the sublessee than what he or she may have originally paid, leaving the remaining rent owed to the lessor to be paid by the original lessee. However, if market prices have increased since the original lease was signed, the sublessor might be able to secure a higher rent price than what is owed the original lessor. However, many commercial leases stipulate that any overages in rent be shared with the landlord, the lessor.

In residential real estate, it is sometimes illegal to charge the subtenant more than the original amount in the sublessee's contract (for instance, in a rent control situation where the rental amount is controlled by law). Subletting of social housing is generally illegal, whatever the rent charged to the subtenant; in the UK it is officially described as a category of housing fraud. In New York the subletting of Mitchell-Lama cooperatives is illegal. Mitchell-Lama residents must maintain a primary residence to remain in their cooperative.

A sublease can also apply to vehicles as an alternate type of car rental. In a vehicle sublease, a lessee or vehicle owner can assign a lease to a third party and by way of contractual agreement for specific dates. Although this arrangement is not popular, it is a growing trend in the travel industry as a less expensive alternative for travelers and locals.

== Equipment leasing ==
Leasing is also used as a form of financing to acquire equipment for use and purchase. Many organizations and companies use lease financing for the acquisition and use of many types of equipment, including manufacturing and mining machinery, vessels and containers, construction and off-road equipment, medical technology and equipment, agricultural equipment, aircraft, rail cars and rolling stock, trucks and transportation equipment, business, retail and office equipment, IT equipment and software.

Lease financing for equipment is generally provided by banks, captives and independent finance companies.

== See also ==
- Ecoleasing
- Finance lease
- Leasehold estate
- Leasehold valuation tribunal
- Leveraged lease
- Operating lease
- Recital (law)
- Renting
- Vehicle leasing
