= Finance lease =

Type of lease; asset is owned by a finance company

A finance lease (also known as a capital lease or a sales lease) is a type of lease in which a finance company is typically the legal owner of the asset for the duration of the lease, while the lessee has operating control over the asset and some share of the economic risks and returns from the change in its valuation.

More specifically, it is a commercial arrangement where:

- the lessee (customer or borrower) will select an asset (equipment, software);
- the lessor (finance company) will purchase that asset;
- the lessee will have use of that asset during the lease;
- the lessee will pay a series of rentals or installments for the use of that asset;
- the lessor will recover a large part or all of the cost of the asset plus earn interest from the rentals paid by the lessee;
- the lessee has the option to acquire ownership of the asset (e.g. paying the last rental, or bargain option purchase price).

A finance lease has similar financial characteristics to hire purchase agreements and closed-end leasing as the usual outcome is that the lessee will become the owner of the asset at the end of the lease, but has different accounting treatments and tax implications. There may be tax benefits for the lessee to lease an asset rather than purchase it and this may be the motivation to obtain a finance lease.

== Impact on accounting ==
- Since a finance lease is capitalized, both assets and liabilities in the balance sheet increase. As a consequence, working capital stays the same, but the debt/equity ratio increases, creating additional leverage.
- Finance lease expenses are allocated between interest expense and principal value much like a bond or loan; therefore, in a statement of cash flows, part of the lease payments are reported under operating cash flow but part under financing cash flow. Therefore, operating cash flow increases.
- Under operating lease conditions, lease obligations are not recognized; therefore, leverage ratios are understated and ratios of return (ROE and ROA) are overstated.

The key IFRS criterion is:

If "substantially all the risks and rewards" of ownership are transferred to the lessee then it is a finance lease. If it is not a finance lease then it is an operating lease. The transfer of risk to the lessee may be shown by lease terms such as an option for the lessee to buy the asset at a low price (typically the residual value) at the end of the lease. The nature of the asset (whether it is likely to be used by anyone other than the lessee), the length of the lease term (whether it covers most of the useful life of the asset), and the present value of lease payments (whether they cover the cost of the asset) may also be factors.

IFRS does not provide a rigid set of rules for classifying leases and there will always be borderline cases. It is also still sometimes possible to use leases to make balance sheets look better, provided that the lessee can justify treating them as operating leases.

The classification of large transactions, such as sale and leasebacks of property, may have a significant effect on the accounts and on measures of financial stability such as gearing. However, it is worth remembering that an improvement in financial gearing may be offset by a worsening of operational gearing and vice versa.

== Accounting treatment by country ==
=== International Financial Reporting Standards (IFRS) ===
In the over 100 countries that govern accounting using International Financial Reporting Standards, the controlling standard is IFRS 16, "Leases" which an entity shall apply for annual reporting periods beginning on or after 1 January 2019. IFRS 16, phased out the previous test for lessees. Lessors continue to apply this test. For a lessor, a lease is financed if any of the following five criteria (IFRS 16.63) are met: (a) the lease transfers ownership of the underlying asset to the lessee by the end of the lease term; (b) the lessee has the option to purchase the underlying asset at a price that is expected to be sufficiently lower than the fair value at the date the option becomes exercisable for it to be reasonably certain, at the inception date, that the option will be exercised; (c) the lease term is for the major part of the economic life of the underlying asset even if the title is not transferred; (d) at the inception date, the present value of the lease payments amounts to at least substantially all of the fair value of the underlying asset; and (e) the underlying asset is of such a specialised nature that only the lessee can use it without major modifications.

IFRS 16.22 requires all lessees to recognize all leases as finance leases (a right-of-use asset and a lease liability) however a lessee may elect (IFRS 16.5) not to apply this requirement to: (a) short-term leases; and (b) leases for which the underlying asset is of low value.

IAS 17 is now transitioning to IFRS 16, as a joint project with the U.S. lease accounting standard. The standard was published in 2016, with companies required to have implemented it by 2019 or earlier. The criteria for being classified as a finance lease are similar to the above, but judgment is required - simply meeting one requirement may not be enough.

=== US Generally Accepted Accounting Principles (US GAAP) ===
As part of the convergence project with IFRS, The FASB replaced topic ASC 840 with topic ASC 842 (from December 15, 2018, for SEC-registered companies and December 15, 2021, for all remaining entities).

Similarly to IFRS 15, ASC 842 requires lessees to recognize a right-of-use asset and a lease liability for all leases except short-term leases (ASC 842 does not include an exception for low-value assets).

Unlike IFRS 16, ASC 842 retains the test to determine if a lease is operating or financial (it adopted the same 5 criteria IFRS 16 applies to lessors). However, an operating lease under ASC 842 is significantly different from an operating lease under ASC 840. As a result, the only practical difference between a financial and operating lease under ASC 842 is that the liability is amortized using an effective interest rate (financial lease) or straight-line (operating lease).

ASC 842 also simplified the guidance For lessors by eliminating "leveraged type" leases.

=== Australia ===
In Australia, the accounting standard pertaining to leases is AASB 117 'Leases'. AASB 117 was released in July 2004. AASB 117 'Leases' applies to accounting for leases other than (a) leases to explore for or use minerals, oil, natural gas, and similar non-regenerative resources; and (b) licensing agreements for such items as motion picture films, video recordings, plays, manuscripts, patents, and copyrights.

According to AASB 117, paragraph 4, a lease is an agreement whereby the lessor conveys to the lessee in return for a payment or series of payments the right to use an asset for an agreed period of time.

A lease is classified as a finance lease if it "transfers substantially all the risks and rewards incidental to ownership of an asset." (AASB 117, p8) There are no strict guidelines as to what constitutes a finance lease, however, guidelines are provided within the standard.

=== India ===
A finance lease is one in which risks and rewards incidental to the ownership of the leased asset are transferred to the lessee but not the actual owner. Thus, in the case of a finance lease, we can say that notional ownership is passed to the lessee. The amount paid as interest during the lease period is shown on the Proprietary Limited DR side of the lessee.

Features:

- It's not cancelable.
- The lessor may or may not bear the cost of insurance, repairs, maintenance, etc. Usually, the lessee has to bear all the costs.
- The lessor may transfer ownership of the asset to the lessee by the end of the lease term.
- The lessee has the option to purchase the asset at a price that is expected to be sufficiently lower than its value at the end of the lease period.

=== United States ===
Under US accounting standards, a finance (capital) lease is a lease that meets at least one of the following criteria:

- ownership of the asset is transferred to the lessee at the end of the lease term;
- the lease grants the lessee an option to purchase the asset and the lessee is reasonably certain to exercise the option;
- the lease term is for the major part of the remaining economic life of the underlying asset (75% of the asset's estimated useful life or greater);
- the present value of the lease payments and any residual value guaranteed by the lessee equals or exceeds substantially all of the fair value of the asset (90% of the total original cost of the equipment);
- The asset is of such a specialized nature that it is expected to have no alternative use to the lessor at the end of the lease term.

Following the GAAP accounting point of view, such a lease is classified as essentially equivalent to a purchase by the lessee and is capitalized on the lessee's balance sheet. See Statement of Financial Accounting Standards No. 13 (FAS 13) for more details on classification and accounting.

==== Special Case: Finance Leases under UCC Article 2A ====
The term sometimes means a special case of lease defined by Article 2A of the Uniform Commercial Code (specifically, Sec. 2A-103(1) (g)). Such a finance lease recognizes that some lessors are financial institutions or other business organizations that lease the goods in question purely as a financial accommodation and do not want to have the warranty and other entanglements that are usually associated with leases by companies that are manufacturers or merchants of such goods. Under a UCC 2A finance lease, the lessee pays the payments to the lessor (and indeed must do so, regardless of any defect in the leased goods – this obligation usually being contained in a "hell or high water" clause), but any claims related to defects in the leased goods may be brought only against the actual supplier of the goods. UCC 2A finance leases are usually easy to identify because they commonly contain a clause specifically declaring that the lease is to be considered a finance lease under UCC 2A.

== See also ==
- Lease
- Leasing
- Operating lease
- Leveraged lease
- Accounting for leases in the United States
