= Off-balance-sheet =

Asset, debt, or financing activity not on a company's balance sheet

In accounting, "off-balance-sheet" (OBS), or incognito leverage, usually describes an asset, debt, or financing activity not on the company's balance sheet. Total return swaps are an example of an off-balance-sheet item.

Some companies may have significant amounts of off-balance-sheet assets and liabilities. For example, financial institutions often offer asset management or brokerage services to their clients. The assets managed or brokered as part of these offered services (often securities) usually belong to the individual clients directly or in trust, although the company provides management, depository or other services to the client. The company itself has no direct claim to the assets, so it does not record them on its balance sheet (they are off-balance-sheet assets), while it usually has some basic fiduciary duties with respect to the client. Financial institutions may report off-balance-sheet items in their accounting statements formally, and may also refer to "assets under management", a figure that may include on- and off-balance-sheet items.

Under previous accounting rules both in the United States (U.S. GAAP) and internationally (IFRS), operating leases were off-balance-sheet financing. Under current accounting rules (ASC 842, IFRS 16), operating leases are on the balance sheet. Financial obligations of unconsolidated subsidiaries (because they are not wholly owned by the parent) may also be off-balance-sheet. Such obligations were part of the accounting fraud at Enron.

The formal accounting distinction between on- and off-balance-sheet items can be quite detailed and will depend to some degree on management judgments, but in general terms, an item should appear on the company's balance sheet if it is an asset or liability that the company owns or is legally responsible for; uncertain assets or liabilities must also meet tests of being probable, measurable and meaningful. For example, a company that is being sued for damages would not include the potential legal liability on its balance sheet until a legal judgment against it is likely and the amount of the judgment can be estimated; if the amount at risk is small, it may not appear on the company's accounts until a judgment is rendered.

== Differences between on and off balance sheets ==
Traditionally, banks lend to borrowers under tight lending standards, keep loans on their balance sheets and retain credit risk—the risk that borrowers will default (be unable to repay interest and principal as specified in the loan contract). In contrast, securitization enables banks to remove loans from balance sheets and transfer the credit risk associated with those loans. Therefore, two types of items are of interest: on balance sheet and off balance sheet. The former is represented by traditional loans, since banks indicate loans on the asset side of their balance sheets. However, securitized loans are represented off the balance sheet, because securitization involves selling the loans to a third party (the loan originator and the borrower being the first two parties). Banks disclose details of securitized assets only in notes to their financial statements.

== Banking example ==
A bank may have substantial sums in off-balance-sheet accounts, and the distinction between these accounts may not seem obvious. For example, when a bank has a customer who deposits $1 million in a regular bank deposit account, the bank has a $1 million liability. If the customer chooses to transfer the deposit to a money market mutual fund account sponsored by the same bank, the $1 million would not be a liability of the bank, but an amount held in trust for the client (formally as shares or units in a form of collective fund). If the funds are used to purchase stock, the stock is similarly not owned by the bank, and do not appear as an asset or liability of the bank. If the client subsequently sells the stock and deposits the proceeds in a regular bank account, these would now again appear as a liability of the bank. As an example, UBS has CHF 60.31 billion Undrawn irrevocable credit facilities off its balance sheet in 2008 (US$60.37 billion). Citibank has US$960 billion in off-balance-sheet assets in 2010, which amounts to 6% of the GDP of the United States.
