= Tangible property =

Legal term for anything which has physical substance

In law, tangible property is property that can be touched, and includes both real property and personal property (or moveable property), and stands in distinction to intangible property.

In English law and some Commonwealth legal systems, items of tangible property are referred to as choses in possession (or a chose in possession in the singular). However, some property, despite being physical in nature, is classified in many legal systems as intangible property rather than tangible property because the rights associated with the physical item are of far greater significance than the physical properties. Principally, these are documentary intangibles. For example, a promissory note is a piece of paper that can be touched, but the real significance is not the physical paper, but the legal rights which the paper confers, and hence the promissory note is defined by the legal debt rather than the physical attributes.

A unique category of property is money, which in some legal systems is treated as tangible property and in others as intangible property. Whilst most countries legal tender is expressed in the form of intangible property ("The Treasury of Country X hereby promises to pay to the bearer on demand...."), in practice banknotes are now rarely ever redeemed in any country, which has led to banknotes and coins being classified as tangible property in most modern legal systems.

== Owning tangible property: rights and responsibilities ==
As a tangible property owner, certain rights and responsibilities come with the territory. The right to use, occupy, sell, rent, mortgage, or give away your property is present. Changes can also be made like renovating, rebuilding or developing the property. These rights are not limitless, however, as local regulations like building codes, zoning laws, and homeowner’s association rules still apply.
