= Leveraged lease =

A leveraged lease or leased lender is a lease in which the lessor puts up some of the money required to purchase the asset and borrows the rest from a lender. The lender is given a senior secured interest on the asset and an assignment of the lease and lease payments. The lessee typically makes payments directly to the lender as the lease payments are assigned to the lender.

The term may also refer to a lease agreement wherein the lessor, by borrowing funds from a lending institution, finances the purchase of the asset being leased.

The lessor pays the lending institution back by way of the lease payments received from the lessee. Under the loan agreement, the lender has rights to the asset and the lease payments if the lessor defaults.

In this type of lease, the lessor provides an equity portion (often 20% to 50%) of the equipment cost and lenders provide the balance on a nonrecourse debt basis. The lessor receives the tax benefits of ownership.
