= Operating lease =

The expression operating lease is somewhat confusing as it has a different meaning based on the context that is under consideration. From a product characteristic standpoint, this type of a lease, as distinguished from a finance lease, is one where the lessor takes larger residual risk, whereas finance leases have no or a very low residual value position. As such, the operating lease is non full payout. From an accounting standpoint, this type of lease (if it fails to meet varied criteria that define a finance lease) results in off balance sheet financing which can be advantageous for companies in terms of gearing and other accounting ratios.

The determination of whether a lease is a finance (also called capital) lease or an operating lease from an accounting point of view is defined in the United States by Statement of Financial Accounting Standards No. 13 (FAS 13). In countries covered by International Financial Reporting Standards, the tests are defined in IAS 17. In July 2006, the Financial Accounting Standards Board (FASB) and the International Accounting Standards Board (IASB) announced the commencement of a joint project to comprehensively reconsider lease accounting. In July 2008, the boards decided to defer any changes to lessor accounting, while continuing with the project for lessee accounting, with the stated intention to recognise an asset and liability for all lessee leases (in essence, eliminating operating lease accounting). This culminated in the issuance of IFRS 16 and FASB Topic 842. Both are effective January 1, 2019. The similarity in the two pronouncements is that leases, which previously qualified as operating leases- and hence resulted in off balance sheet treatment, are now to be capitalized by the lessee.

Unlike a finance lease (differs by geography & whether a small residual value), at the end of the operating lease the title to the asset does not pass to the lessee, but remains with the lessor. Accordingly, at the end of an operating lease, the lessee has several options:

- Return of the equipment
- Renewal of the lease
- Purchase of the equipment (not available in all geographies)

Operating leases, where the lessor takes a residual position, offer a host of benefits to the lessee the type of which finance leases do not. Other benefits of an operating lease vs a finance lease are that working capital is maintained, rentals will be fully tax-deductible if the equipment is used to generate taxable income and there is no resale value risk as the financier will own the asset at the end of the operating lease.

== Accounting model ==
SIC-15, issued by the Standard Interpretations Committee (SIC) in July 1999 and effective after January 1, 1999, explains how both lessees and lessors should recognize incentives related to operating leases. It states that lease incentives, like rent-free periods or relocation cost contributions, are part of the lease's overall value. According to IAS 17.24 and 17.42 (rev. 1997), these incentives should reduce lease income or expense and be recognized evenly over the lease term by both parties. As of January 1, 2019, SIC-15 was superseded by IFRS 16.

=== Lessee ===
IFRS 16, paragraph 5, provides that lessees are allowed to choose not to recognize an asset and lease liability for two types of leases: short-term leases and low-value leases. This means that lessees can opt for operating lease accounting for these lease categories. If this option is taken, IFRS 16, paragraph 6, mandates that the lease payments must be recognized as an expense. This can be done either on a straight-line basis over the lease term or using another systematic basis that reflects the benefit received by the lessee.

=== Lessor ===
According to IFRS 16, paragraph 81, lessors must recognize lease payments from operating leases as income either on a straight-line basis or another systematic basis that better reflects the asset's usage pattern.

An underlying asset subject to operating lease shall be presented on the lessor's statement of financial position based on its nature. The underlying asset is still the lessor's asset. As a consequence, the lessor is responsible for ownership costs, including depreciation, property taxes, insurance, and maintenance, but can pass certain costs (taxes, insurance, maintenance) to the lessee.

== See also ==
- Leasehold estate – Ownership of a temporary right to hold land or property
- Finance lease
- Novated lease
- Vehicle leasing
- Accounting for leases in the United States
