= Economics education =

Field within economics

Programs in Economics

High school:

- AP Economics
- GCE Economics
- HSC Economics
- IB Economics
- NSC Economics
- Test of Economic Literacy

Undergraduate:

- Bachelor of Economics
- Philosophy, politics and economics
- Test of Understanding in College Economics

Graduate:

- Master of Economics
- Cand.oecon.; Civilekonom; Civiløkonom; Siviløkonom
- European Joint Master degree in Economics
  - QEM
  - EMLE

Economics education or economic education is a field within economics that focuses on two main themes:

- The current state of, and efforts to improve, the economics curriculum, materials and pedagogical techniques used to teach economics at all educational levels; and
- Research into the effectiveness of alternative instructional techniques in economics, the level of economic literacy of various groups, and factors that influence the level of economic literacy.

Economics education is distinct from economics of education, which focuses on the economics of the institution of education. This article discusses the field conceptually, and also provides a general outline of the typical curriculum.

== Economics education ==
=== Characterization ===
Akarowhe found that Economics Education can be seen as a process, science and product:

- as a process - economics education involves a time phase of inculcating the needed skills and values on the learners, in other words, it entails the preparation of learners for would-be-economics educator (teachers) and disseminating of valuable economics information on learners in other for them to improve their standard of living by engaging in meaningful venture;
- as a science, it means that it is a body of organized knowledge which is subjected to scientific test;
- as a product, economics education involves the inculcation of saleable values/skills/disposition which are desirable by employers of labour and the society at large.

=== Organizations ===
Numerous organizations all over the world devote resources toward economics education.

In the United States, organizations whose primary purpose is the advancement of economics education include the Council for Economic Education (CEE) and its network of councils and centers, Federal Reserve Education (FRE), the Foundation for Teaching Economics and Junior Achievement. The U.S. National Center for Research in Economic Education is a resource for research and educational assessment in economics. Among broader U.S. organizations that devote significant resources toward economics education is the Federal Reserve System.

In the United Kingdom there is The Economics Network, a government-funded national project to support economics education in Higher education contexts, and the non-profit Economics & Business Education Association (EBEA) for secondary education. The non-profit organization Rethinking Economics is an international network of students and teachers promoting a change in the economics education towards more critical engagement, pluralism of theories and real-world applicability of the discipline. The movement has gained widespread support, among others by the Bank of England.

On a global scale, especially in Asia and Africa, there is the Global Association of Economics Education (GAEE), a non-profit organization that transforms conventional curricula into free, interactive learning platforms aligning to daily-life and real-world problems.

According to the Ministry of Education and Science of Ukraine, 28.4% of all students receive specialties in the field of economics, trade and business. An attempt to create a Western-style Ukrainian journal called the Ukrainian Economic Review a few years ago ended in failure. The lack of publication of Ukrainian scientists in Western economic journals indicates the seriousness of the problem.

Journals devoted to the topic of economics education include the Journal of Economic Education, International Review of Economics Education, Australasian Journal of Economics Education.

Many organizations, such as The Economist, Financial Times, Royal Economic Society, and Institute of Economic Affairs, offer essay competitions for economics students.

=== Reform ===
University-level economics curricula, particularly introductory courses, have been criticized for putting undue emphasis on neoclassical economics - with its key assumptions of individual rationality and market equilibrium, described in the next section - and failing to explain real-world economic phenomena such as the 2008 financial crisis; see Mainstream economics § Criticisms and Financial economics § Challenges and criticism.

In response, the CORE Project, for example, has developed course materials, including a textbook called The Economy, that emphasize real-world applications in economics.

Literacy-Targeted instruction in economics argues that the principles level course has too many models and content for an introductory course. The LT approach emphasizes a goal of economic literacy by focusing on a limited number of core concepts to foster deep understanding and real-world application.

== Curriculum ==
Economics is widely offered as a major subject, and often as a specialized degree. Economics is also studied as a stand-alone course in business- and finance degrees, with the purpose of informing management- or investment decision making.

=== Economics programs ===
The typical economics curriculum, and degree structure, summarizes as follows. The core theory comprises microeconomics and macroeconomics, as well as econometrics and mathematical economics; as the student progresses, so the coverage becomes more abstract and mathematical. The various branches of economics and areas of application are built on this base. Some degrees in fact specialize in applied economics, econometrics, political economy or economic history. For further discussion see Bachelor of Economics and Master of Economics; for a listing of universities specializing in economics, see Category:Economics schools.

Micro- and macroeconomics begin with the joint-concepts of supply and demand. Microeconomics develops these respectively for firms and individuals, assuming businesses seek to maximize their profit under the various regimes of competition, and that consumers, similarly, are attempting to ”maximize utility” given their resources; the price will correspond to the point where supply and demand are equal, i.e. a "partial equilibrium". Macroeconomics focuses on the sum total of economic activity - similarly analyzing various equilibria - covering the performance, structure, behavior, and decision-making of an economy as a whole. At the “intermediate” level, microeconomics extends to general equilibrium, to an analytic approach to demand-modeling where curves are derived from utility functions, and to game theory as applied to competition, and hence supply; intermediate macroeconomics covers various advanced models of the economy, differences between schools here (particularly New-Keynesian, New-classical, and Monetarist), and the related policy analysis. At the graduate level, the treatment focuses on microfoundations - where macroeconomic models aggregate microeconomic results - and dynamic stochastic general equilibrium, allowing for heterogeneity, thereby relaxing the idea of a representative agent. In many programs, approaches from heterodox economics are introduced at more advanced levels, especially behavioral economics and experimental economics; here, the key ideas of individual rationality and equilibrium are questioned, and the relevant topics are then revisited.

Econometrics concerns the application of statistical methods to economic data so as to give empirical content to economic relationships. The study begins with the single-equation methods, i.e. (multiple) linear regression, and progresses to (multivariate) time series, simultaneous equation methods and generalized linear models; at the graduate level, the treatment in parallel emphasizes the underlying statistical theory. Students are trained on packages such as STATA, EViews and R. Mathematical economics may be studied in its own right, or via incorporating advanced mathematical-techniques into the micro- and macroeconomic courses; commonly applied are optimization methods and dynamic systems modelling (for cases of "dynamic equilibrium" as above). At advanced levels, real analysis is used to abstract the economic relationships studied. Courses in decision theory, game theory and (agent-based) computational economics may be taught separately. Many universities offer the further specialized Bachelors and Masters "in Econometrics / Mathematical Economics / Quantitative Economics".

Applied economics concerns the application of economic theory and econometrics in specific settings, and to practical issues. As above, the various applied-fields are offered as (optional) courses in the economics degree, following core-work. "Applied Economics Degrees" - bachelors and masters - do cover the core theory, but, often, with a reduction in the number of theory courses, allowing more choice and flexibility in the degree composition. At many schools, specifically focused (and named) degrees are offered in agricultural economics, development economics, and financial economics. Some master's level applied economics programs train students in data-driven analytics and business decision-support, combining microeconomic theory and econometrics with the student's selections from data science, operations research and finance. Applied economics topics are taught in other programs, as relevant - for example health economics and engineering economics are offered in the MPH / MHA and M.Eng. respectively - but with a reduction in the level of theory.

=== Business degrees ===
In business degrees - undergraduate and masters - a course in "economics for managers", or the like, is typically a program requirement. Here the macroeconomic element deals with topics relevant to commerce, such as inflation, business cycles, exchange rates, the banking system, and the money supply; the microeconomic element mainly focuses on the managerial economics relating to product pricing, industry structure and competition. The theory is largely at the "supply and demand" level. Elements of econometrics may be incorporated into a business statistics or business mathematics course. See Master of Business Administration § Content. The high school courses listed, largely mirror this content; their theory discussion may overlap the first courses in the major. Many undergraduate business degrees offer economics as a major, with the structure largely as above, although often with fewer theoretical and mathematical courses.

=== Finance programs ===
Economics is commonly combined with Finance as an undergraduate double major; depending on the program, the economics coverage may be theoretical, as for the standard degree, or applied, as for business degrees. Similarly, Professional certification programs, such as the CFA and CIIA, often include topics in economics. At the postgraduate level, the macroeconomic element will, again, be similar to the business masters, but may also emphasize forecasting - which is widely applied in resource allocation and other financial applications such as financial analysis - and is then (slightly) more theoretical. Managerial-type microeconomics may be included in programs with a strong business focus, such as the Master of Science in Finance; otherwise, microeconomics is explicitly included only in the more theoretical Master of Finance programs, here emphasizing concepts from financial economics such as expected utility (regardless, relevant concepts are covered when required as underpin to a specific module).

== See also ==
- Category:Economics schools
- Economics handbooks
- Economist § Professions
- Education economics
- Simulations and games in economics education
