= Master of Economics =

Postgraduate master's degree

The Master of Economics (MEcon or MEc) is a postgraduate master's degree in economics comprising training in economic theory, econometrics, and/or applied economics. The degree is also offered as a specialized MS or MSc, MA or MCom In Economics; variants are the Master in Economic Sciences (MEconSc), and the Master of Applied Economics.

== Structure ==
The degree may be offered as a terminal degree or as additional preparation for doctoral study, and is sometimes offered as a professional degree, such as the emerging MPS in Applied Economics. The program emphases and curricula will differ correspondingly. The course of study for the master's degree lasts from one to two years. A thesis is often required, particularly for terminal degrees. Many universities (in the United States) do not offer the master's degree directly; rather, the degree is routinely awarded as a master's degree "en route", after completion of a designated phase of the PhD program in economics.

Entry requirements are undergraduate work in (calculus-based) economics, at least at the "intermediate" level, and often as a major, and a sufficient level of mathematical training (including courses in probability and statistics; often (multivariable) calculus and linear algebra; and sometimes mathematical analysis.)

== Curriculum ==
Typically, the curriculum is structured around core topics, with any optional coursework complementary to the program focus. The core modules are usually in microeconomic theory, macroeconomic theory and econometrics. At this level, the topics covered are microfoundations and dynamic stochastic general equilibrium, and allow for heterogeneity, relaxing the idea of a representative agent. Sometimes, topics from heterodox economics are introduced. Econometrics extends the undergraduate domain to multiple linear regression and multivariate time series, and introduces simultaneous equation methods and generalized linear models. Game theory and computational economics are often included. Some (doctoral) programs include core work in economic history.

Theory-focused degrees will tend to cover these core topics more mathematically, and emphasize econometric theory as opposed to econometric techniques and software; these will also require a separate course in mathematical economics. Note though that regardless of focus, most programs "now place a marked emphasis on the primacy of mathematics", and many universities thus also require "Quantitative Techniques for Economics", or "Math for Economics" especially where mathematical economics is not a core course.

The optional or additional coursework will depend on the program's emphasis. In theory-focused degrees, and those preparing students for doctoral work, this coursework is often in these same core topics, but in greater depth. In terminal or applied or career-focused degrees, options may include public finance, labour-, financial-, development-, industrial-, health- or agricultural economics. These degrees may also allow for a specialization in one of these areas, and may be named correspondingly (for example Master's in Financial Economics, Masters in International Economics, Masters in Development Economics, Master's in Sustainable Economic Development and Masters in Agricultural Economics.) Recently, the more general Master of Applied Economics, combines economic theory with selections from finance and data analytics, including machine learning and data science.

== See also ==
- Bachelor of Economics
- Category:Economics schools
- Civilekonom; Civiløkonom; Siviløkonom; Cand.oecon.
- Economics education
- Economist § Professions
- European Joint Master degree in Economics
  - QEM
  - EMLE
- Humanistic economics
- Master of Finance
- Outline of economics

== External links and references ==
Discussion

- Graduate Degrees in Economics, The American Economic Association
- Masters degrees in economics: How to be a leader of the future, The Independent
- Is an M.A. in Economics a Waste of Time?, economics.about.com (archived)
- Getting an MBA vs. a Master's in Finance or Economics, mbapodcaster.com
- Applying to graduate school in economics, davidson.edu
- Books to Study Before Going to Graduate School in Economics, economics.about.com

Lists of programs

- Alphabetical List of U.S. Programs
