= MFE =

MFE may refer to:

== Businesses and organizations ==
- McAllen Miller International Airport
- Ministry for the Environment (New Zealand)
- MFE - MediaForEurope

== Education ==
- Master of Financial Economics
- Master of Financial Engineering

== Other uses ==
- European Federalist Movement
- Mail for Exchange
- Magnetic fusion energy
- Mauritian Creole, by ISO language code
- McAllen Miller International Airport, by IATA airport code
