= Bachelor of Economics =

Undergraduate academic degree

A Bachelor of Economics (BEc or BEcon) is an academic degree awarded to students who have completed specialised undergraduate studies in economics. Variants include the Bachelor of Applied Economics and Bachelor of Economic Science, and "tagged" degrees such as BA in Economics, BS (Econ) / BSc (Econ), BCom (Economics), and BSocSc (Econ).

These degrees aim to provide students with a comprehensive understanding of economic theories, principles, and models, and their application in analyzing real-world economic issues. The program then encompasses a broad range of topics in the field of economics, including microeconomics, macroeconomics, econometrics, economic history, and international economics. It is, at the same time, substantially more theoretical and mathematically rigorous than the economics major within generalist undergraduate degrees (e.g. BBA, BA or BCom).

Graduates often pursue careers in economic analysis, policy development, finance, and business consulting, or continue their studies in graduate programs.

== Structure ==
The BEcon and the specialized degrees each have their own structure, differing by university. Generally, though, the curriculum is built around a core of theory, to which is added courses in the various branches, and areas of application; see next section. In the US, a structured "program" is often offered within the College of Arts and Sciences. In the Commonwealth, specialized BCom-Economics degrees are often offered through the commerce faculty. The program is often available as a social science degree. Several universities offer a separate 1 year Honours degree, and the program then comprises "3 years plus 1"; often, Honours (US, Honors) is included in the four year structure. An Honours research-thesis will be required.

Under both specialized and general programs, economics is often combined with a second major in finance or management, or with other social sciences; in the US, economics is often combined with a quantitative subject such as math or computer science. The interdisciplinary "PPE" integrates philosophy and politics with economics. Some business schools offer a joint program with the economics department; similarly, joint-majors are commonly offered with the mathematics department.

Some universities allow that the degree as a whole may be further specialized; either in one of the applied areas, or, more common, in one of the major branches, often development economics, econometrics / mathematical economics, political economy, agricultural economics, or business economics. Others allow this specialization at the Honours degree level. Some universities offer a "Bachelor of Applied Economics" or similar, which will be career-focused. Degrees in Financial Economics, integrate finance into the economics program, as opposed to via a second major.

== Curriculum ==
Typically, the core-degree comprises microeconomics, macroeconomics and econometrics; while mathematical economics is sometimes required. Micro- and macroeconomics are taught through the "intermediate" level, preparing the student for the "advanced" postgraduate courses. Macroeconomics extends to a discussion of the more advanced models of the economy, differences here between schools, and the related policy analysis; microeconomics extends to general equilibrium, to an analytic approach to demand with curves derived from utility functions, and to game theory as applied to competition, and hence supply. Some programs then specify a course in microfoundations, where the macroeconomic models are derived by aggregating microeconomic models. Econometrics is intended to give empirical content to these economic relationships, and here focuses on the single-equation methods largely linear regression, and time series; students are trained on packages such as STATA, EViews and R.

Building on this core, are courses in the major branches of economics: monetary economics, international economics, development economics, labor economics, and welfare economics. Social science oriented degrees may emphasize economic statistics and political economy; and often do not require econometrics or mathematical economics. History of economic thought and economic history may be included in either variant.

Electives may be offered in the above branches, or in various areas of applied economics, such as agricultural economics, environmental economics, resource economics, managerial economics, and financial economics. Mathematical economics is often an elective; it is generally recommended for those intending graduate training in Economics. In the US, these students will often also study selected math-courses in multivariable calculus, differential equations, linear algebra, optimization, and sometimes analysis.

Co-requisite courses from outside of economics are invariably a program requirement. Common to all business programs are introductory or business statistics, and "quantitative techniques", comprising basic calculus, interest calculations, and sometimes matrix operations; the social science programs sometimes include these, and may also require credits in sociology and psychology. Some knowledge of accountancy or management may be assumed in the "applied courses"; credits in these are usually inherent in the business degree.

Most specialized programs require further "Mathematics for Economists", essentially a (detailed) survey of the topics mentioned above re US students; see Business mathematics § Undergraduate. Statistics is similarly extended, often within the math course, as underpin to the econometrics coursework. The specialized BSc programs are often more math intensive than the BA programs. Similarly, the Honors track will have additional math requirements.

== See also ==
- Economics education
- Economist § Professions
- Category:Economics schools
- Master of Economics
- Outline of economics
- Humanistic economics
- Philosophy, Politics and Economics degree
- Test of Understanding in College Economics
- Related degrees:
  - Bachelor of Social Science
  - Business and management degrees
  - Bachelor of Finance
