= Master of Financial Economics =

A Master of Financial Economics is a postgraduate master's degree focusing on theoretical finance. The degree provides a rigorous understanding of financial economics, emphasizing the economic framework underpinning financial and investment decisioning. The degree is postgraduate, and usually incorporates a thesis or research component. Programs may be offered jointly by the business school and the economics department.

Closely related degrees include the Master of Finance and Economics and the Master of Economics with a specialization in Finance. Since c. 2010 undergraduate degrees in the discipline have also been offered.

== Structure ==
Masters in Financial Economics are usually one to one and a half years in duration, and typically include a thesis or research component. The nature of the degree differs by university. Generally, the degree is largely theoretical, and prepares graduates for research positions, for doctoral study in economics, or for roles in applied economics. Some are positioned as professional degrees, preparing graduates for careers in investment banking and finance, and are comparable to the Master of Science in Finance, though with an increased weighting towards economic theory. In some cases, programs are substantially quantitative and are largely akin to a Master of Quantitative Finance.

The curriculum is distributed between theory, applications, and modelling, with the emphasis on each differing by university and program, as outlined.

- The theory component centres on decision making under uncertainty in the context of the financial markets and the resultant economic and financial models. The degree essentially explores how rational investors would apply decision theory to the problem of investment. Investment under "certainty" is initially considered (Fisher separation theorem, "theory of investment value", Modigliani–Miller theorem). Choice under uncertainty is then introduced, and the twin assumptions of rationality and market efficiency lead to modern portfolio theory and the CAPM, and to the Black–Scholes theory for option pricing. Where the program emphasizes economics, the curriculum is extended: it explores phenomena where these assumptions do not hold (market microstructure, behavioural finance) and it discusses models which are further generalised (arbitrage pricing theory, continuous time finance / Martingale pricing) or extended (Multi-factor models, models of the short rate, intertemporal CAPM, Black–Litterman model). Coursework here is often titled "Asset pricing" and "Corporate finance theory". Economics focused programs (often) separately cover microeconomics or decision theory as foundational topics.
- Application of the economic principles includes asset allocation and valuation, and covers specific financial instruments—such as fixed income, equities, derivatives, foreign exchange—and their portfolios. The aim here is twofold: firstly, to complement the theory; secondly, providing graduates with practical market knowledge. In the economics-focused degrees, this coverage may (will) be of secondary importance, while in the professional degrees, it is a major component, and often includes separate course work in (practical) corporate finance, portfolio management and financial risk management. Macroeconomics is also usually included; often though, as opposed to covering macroeconomic theory in general, the topics are applied and finance-related with a focus on modelling and forecasting the relationships between asset classes and their expected returns.
- The modelling curriculum complements both of the above. The theory is augmented via the study of econometrics, financial time series and statistical modelling, with a focus on the empirical and statistical testing of economic theory, and on developing and documenting new econometric models. Students are taught to model using statistical packages such as SAS and EViews, and increasingly Python and R. The applications are reinforced through the computer based implementation of the more complex problems (often including numeric methods for option pricing, Value at risk, portfolio optimization and yield curve modeling). Here, though, the focus is typically on the concept as opposed to the modelling, and may therefore be limited to the spreadsheet environment: Computational finance is the domain of specialized degrees, although some Financial Economics programs do emphasize mathematical modelling and programming.

The programs require a bachelor's degree prior to admission, but do not (usually) require an undergraduate major in finance or economics; a typical requirement is exposure to (multivariable) calculus and differential equations, statistics and probability theory, and linear algebra. Many programs include a review of these topics as an admission- or preliminary course.

== Comparison with other qualifications ==
There is some overlap with programs in financial engineering, computational finance and mathematical finance; see Master of Quantitative Finance (MQF). These degrees aim to train practitioners and "quants"—i.e. specialists in derivatives, fixed income and risk analysis—as opposed to economists, and their curricula are therefore weighted toward stochastic calculus, numerical methods, simulation techniques and programming, and are quantitative (well) beyond the level of the Financial Economics degree. Entrance requirements are similarly more mathematical. On the other hand, coverage of financial and economic theory, and econometrics, while significant, is comparatively secondary. As mentioned, some Financial Economics programs are substantially quantitative; these differ little from the MQF.

The overlap with general finance degrees, such as a Master of Science in Finance (MSF) or an M.B.A. in finance, is further limited, particularly where the Financial Economics program is theory oriented. These degrees are focused on financial management, corporate finance and investment management, and are practice oriented with limited exposure to the underlying economic theory. However, since these courses train graduates in the use of the models developed in Financial Economics, the theory is (sometimes) covered in the context of a (basic) understanding of model assumptions. Similar comments apply to professional certifications such as the Chartered Financial Analyst (CFA) designation. The Master of Finance (M.Fin.) and M.Sc. Finance, as opposed to the MSF, have a significant theory component (as well as quantitative component), and largely overlap with the Masters in Financial Economics.

== See also ==
- Master of Finance
- Master of Economics
- Master of Quantitative Finance
- QEM
- Outline of finance § Education
