= Test of Economic Knowledge =

The Test of Economic Knowledge or TEK is a standardized test of economics nationally norm-referenced in the United States for use in middle schools and in lower-grade levels of high schools. It is one of four grade-level specific standardized economics tests (i.e., Basic Economics Test (BET), Test of Economic Literacy (TEL) and Test of Understanding in College Economics (TUCE)) sponsored and published by the National Council on Economic Education (NCEE).

The TEK was initially designed in 1987 and revised into its second edition in 2007 and will soon be available, along with an examiner's manual, for teachers, school administrators and researchers through the NCEE. The revision process took place at the National Center for Research in Economic Education (NCREE) and included a new set of norm-references that consisted of teacher and student participation from twenty-five U.S. states. The TEK has two parallel forms, each composed of forty 4-option multiple-choice items with content validity based on the Voluntary National Content Standards in Economics.

== See also ==
Test of Economic Literacy
