= NCREE =

NCREE may refer to:

- National Center for Research on Earthquake Engineering (NCREE)
- National Center for Research in Economic Education (NCREE)
