= Candidate of Medicine =

Scandinavian academic degree (cand. med.)

Candidate of Medicine (Latin: candidatus medicinae (male), candidata medicinae (female), abbreviated cand. med.) is an academic degree awarded in Denmark, Iceland, and Norway following a six-year medical school education.

The degree can also be written as candidatus/candidata medicinæ (Æ instead of AE). In Danish and Norwegian, the degree is, similar to other Latin degrees, generally not capitalized (i.e. it is written as candidatus/candidata medicinae and abbreviated cand.med.). The abbreviation of the Latin term is almost exclusively used, i.e., they are not translated.

The term candidate refers to those running for public office in Ancient Rome. Traditionally, many doctors (and lawyers) in Denmark and Norway would hold positions directly appointed by the King.

In Denmark and Norway, a higher doctorate of medicine is known as dr.med. (doctor medicinae, literally, Doctor of Medicine). This degree is obtained by those furthering their career in research and is not required or usually obtained by those only working in clinical medicine. Formally it is not, however, required in Denmark to hold a cand.med. degree to acquire the doctorate. In practice most Doctors of Medicine are also Candidates of Medicine.

In Denmark, there are currently two research degrees that can be obtained in the field of medicine, the ph.d., which is not officially a doctorate (although being called the lesser doctorate informally) and the doctorate, dr.med. (informally the higher doctorate). Dr.med. was abolished in Norway in 2008 and replaced by the PhD.

== Norway ==
In Norway, the education is offered at the Norwegian University of Science and Technology, University of Bergen, University of Oslo, and University of Tromsø. Enrollment in a program leading to a medical degree is highly competitive in Norway. The required grades obtained in secondary education are consistently higher for medical degrees than for any other university subject. Following the education, candidates are permitted to work as a doctor and obtain the title cand.med. In order to obtain a clinical specialization (for example general surgery, internal medicine, general practice etc) a cand.med must start as a rotation doctor, first at a hospital for one year and then six months as a general practitioner. During such rotation the candidate hold the title LIS-1. After the rotation service, the candidate med continue more specific training for the specific specialization and hold the title LIS-2.

The first Norwegian to receive this degree was Carl Schultz in 1817. Along with the cand.med.vet., cand.psychol. and cand.theol. it is one of the few Latin titles to survive the "Quality Reform" in Norway.

== Denmark ==
In Denmark, the education is offered at the University of Copenhagen, University of Southern Denmark, University of Aarhus, and Aalborg University. Following the postgraduate education, candidates are permitted to work as a doctor. To obtain a clinical specialization, a cand.med. must start as a rotation doctor, first at a hospital for six months and then six months as a general practitioner (few rotations do not include a stay in general practice; instead, the candidate must complete two six-month rotations at a hospital).

== Medical students ==
In Norway, the term stud.med. (abbreviation of the Latin studiosus medicinae (masculine) or studiosa medicinae (feminine)) is used to denote medical students that are in their final year of medical school and have acquired a licence to practice medicine under the guidance of a more experienced doctor. In Denmark, the term is used for medical students at any point in their studies.

== Other uses ==
In Finland, Germany, and Switzerland, the term cand. med. is commonly used to denote a medical student in a six-year program who has passed the First Medical State Examination after two years of pre-clinical study and has entered the clinical part.

== See also ==
- Candidate (degree)
- Sivilingeniør
- Siviløkonom
