= 2007 Nobel Peace Prize =

Award

- Al Gore and the Intergovernmental Panel on Climate Change (IPCC)
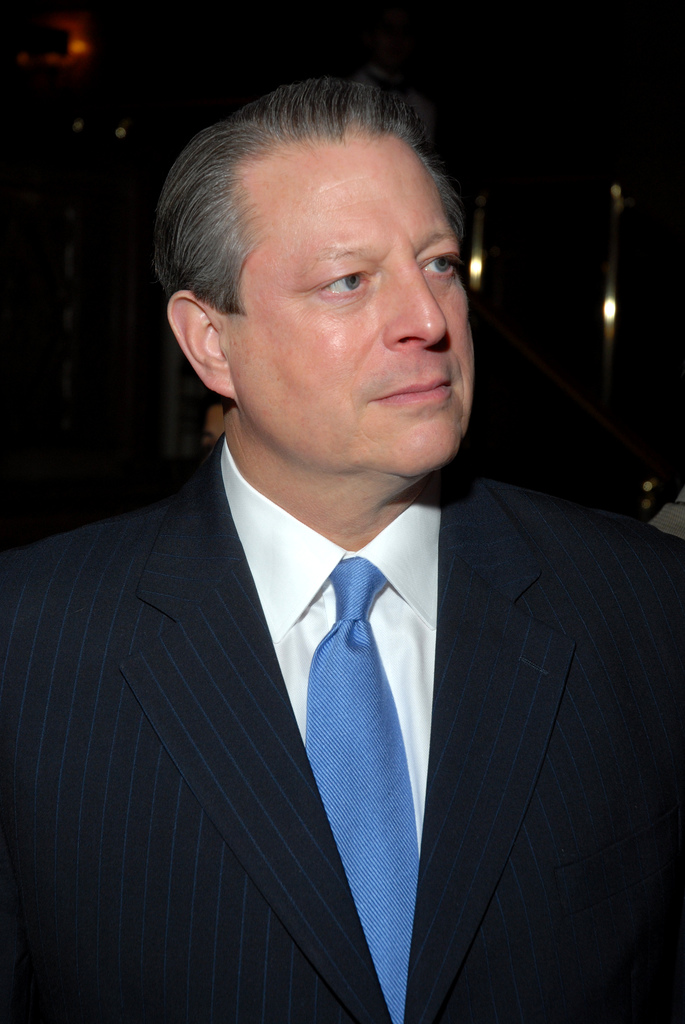
- Gore (pictured) and IPCC "for their efforts to build up and disseminate greater knowledge about man-made climate change, and to lay the foundations for the measures that are needed to counteract such change."
- Date: 12 October 2007 (announcement by Ole Danbolt Mjøs); 10 December 2007 (ceremony)
- Location: Oslo, Norway
- Presented by: Norwegian Nobel Committee
- Reward: 10 million SEK ($1.5M)
- First award: 1901
- Website: Official website

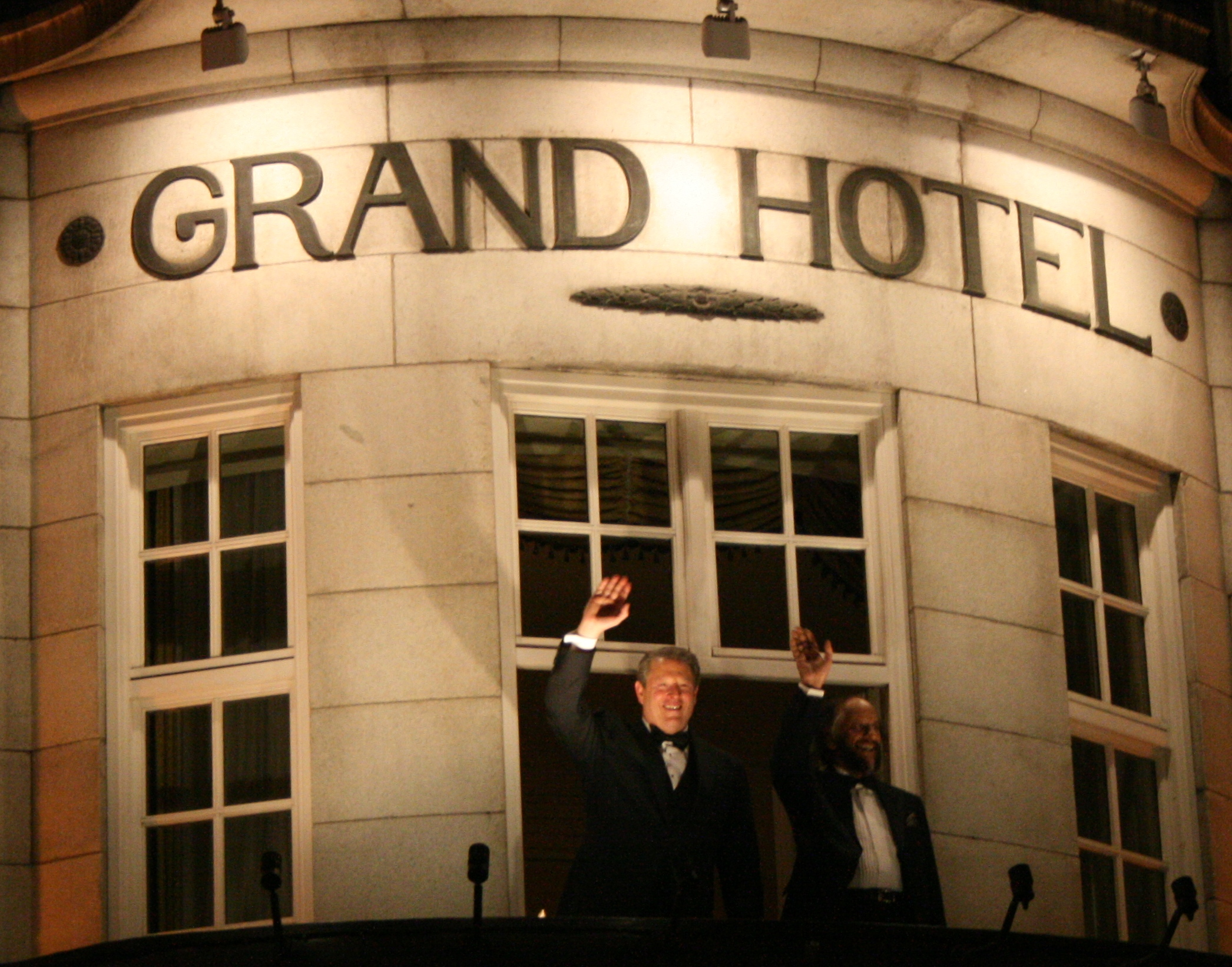
Al Gore and leader of IPCC Rajendra K. Pachauri on the balcony of Grand Hotel, Oslo, Norway, on 10 December 2007

The 2007 Nobel Peace Prize was shared, in two equal parts, between the Intergovernmental Panel on Climate Change (IPCC) (founded in 1988) and United States former vice president, Al Gore (b. 1948) "for their efforts to build up and disseminate greater knowledge about man-made climate change, and to lay the foundations for the measures that are needed to counteract such change".

== Announcement ==
The Norwegian Nobel Committee announced the award on 12 October 2007. It stated that responses to indications of future climate changes must follow the precautionary principle, and that extensive changes would damage living standards, leading to likelihood of wars and violent conflicts. It paid tribute to the work of the IPCC:

Through the scientific reports it has issued over the past two decades, the IPCC has created an ever-broader informed consensus about the connection between human activities and global warming. Thousands of scientists and officials from over one hundred countries have collaborated to achieve greater certainty as to the scale of the warming.

It said that "Al Gore has for a long time been one of the world's leading environmentalist politicians", and described him as "probably the single individual who has done most to create greater worldwide understanding of the measures that need to be adopted." In conclusion, it said the Nobel Committee was "seeking to contribute to a sharper focus on the processes and decisions that appear to be necessary to protect the world’s future climate, and thereby to reduce the threat to the security of mankind. Action is necessary now, before climate change moves beyond man’s control."

The award was given immediate publicity: an Associated Press article published by USA Today on 12 October 2007 and headlined "Gore, scientists share Nobel Peace Prize" quoted Pachauri as saying "All the scientists that have contributed to the work of the IPCC are the Nobel laureates who have been recognized and acknowledged by the Nobel Prize Committee". He added that "they should feel deeply encouraged and inspired. It is their contribution which has been recognized", and said "I only happen to be a functionary that essentially oversees the process." On the same day, the Lawrence Berkeley National Laboratory listed its scientists who had contributed to the IPCC's work, and said that Pachauri had sent a letter to lead authors of the 2007 IPCC Fourth Assessment Report saying that he had "been stunned in a pleasant way with the news of the award of the Nobel Peace Prize for the IPCC. This makes each of you a Nobel Laureate and it is my privilege to acknowledge this honour on your behalf". The letter went on to say that "The fact that the IPCC has earned the recognition that this award embodies, is really a tribute to your knowledge, hard work and application."

== Presentation ==
In Oslo on 10 December 2007, the presentation was made with a speech by Ole Danbolt Mjøs as Chairman of the Norwegian Nobel Committee, and followed by Nobel Lectures given by Rajendra K. Pachauri, representing the IPCC, and Al Gore. In his lecture, Pachauri thanked those contributing to the IPCC:

I pay tribute to the thousands of experts and scientists who have contributed to the work of the Panel over almost two decades of exciting evolution and service to humanity.

== IPCC certificates ==
The IPCC presented scientists who had "contributed substantially to the preparation of IPCC reports" with personalized certificates for "contributing to the award of the Nobel Peace Prize for 2007 to the IPCC". The certificates, which name the individual and feature a reproduction of the Nobel Peace Prize diploma, were sent to "coordinating lead authors, lead authors, review editors, bureau members, staff of the technical support units and staff of the secretariat from the IPCC's inception in 1988 until the award of the prize in 2007."

In a statement of 29 October 2012 the IPCC clarified that the "prize was awarded to the IPCC as an organisation, and not to any individual involved with the IPCC. Thus it is incorrect to refer to any IPCC official, or scientist who worked on IPCC reports, as a Nobel laureate or Nobel Prize winner. It would be correct to describe a scientist who was involved with AR4 or earlier IPCC reports in this way: 'X contributed to the reports of the IPCC, which was awarded the Nobel Peace Prize in 2007.'" It stated that it had not sent the certificates to "contributing authors, expert reviewers and focal points."
