= Mjøs =

Mjøs is a Norwegian surname. Notable people with the surname include:

- Andreas Mjøs (born 1976), Norwegian musician, record producer, and composer
- Ole Danbolt Mjøs (1939–2013), Norwegian physician and politician

== See also ==
- Marte Mjøs Persen
