= Tor Egil Førland =

Norwegian historian and professor

Tor Egil Førland (born 5 May 1959) is professor of history at the University of Oslo.

== Career ==
Førland got his doctorate at the University of Oslo in 1991. His doctoral dissertation was on CoCom and had the title Cold Economic Warfare: The Creation and Prime of CoCom 1948-1954. He has also written several widely cited articles on economic warfare, including "Economic Warfare" and "Strategic Goods": A Conceptual Framework for Analyzing CoCom and The History of Economic Warfare: International Law, Effectiveness, Strategies.

Førland became a professor of history at the University of Oslo in 2001. Between 2003 and 2004 he was Subdean of education at the Faculty of Humanities at the University of Oslo, responsible for implementing the Quality Reform at the faculty. Førland was Head of education and Deputy head of Department of Archaeology, Conservation and History (IAKH) during 2009–2012, before becoming Head of Department in 2013, a position he held until 2020. From 2020 until 2024 he was Head of Department of Philosophy, Classics, History of Art and Ideas. He has also been the editor-in-chief of the website norgeshistorie.no, created by the University of Oslo.

As a historian, Førland has specialized in the radicalism of the 1960s and 1970s and in contemporary international history. He has published books and articles on the history of the EU, European integration, the Cold War and the 1968 protests. He has also written the history of the culture institution Club 7 in Oslo, in the book Club 7 (1998).

Førland has also contributed to the debate on objectivity and values in historiography, taking a stance against the postmodern relativization of truth. He has applied the philosopher Peter Railton’s concept of the “ideal explanatory text” to argue that the ideal of objectivity in historiography is attainable. Most of his work on historical theory is collected in the two books Values, Objectivity, and Explanation in Historiography (2017) and The Poverty of Anti-realism: Critical Perspectives on Postmodernist Philosophy of History (2023).

In 2025 Førland returned to his past as a peace researcher at Peace Research Institute Oslo (PRIO) by starting to work on a biography about the Norwegian peace researcher Johan Galtung.

== Selected bibliography ==
- “Cutting the Sixties Down to Size: Conceptualizing, Historicizing, Explaining”. Journal for the Study of Radicalism 9/2 (2015), pp. 125–148
- “Brought Up to Rebel in the Sixties: Birth Order Irrelevant, Parental Worldview Decisive”. With Trine Rogg Korsvik and Knut-Andreas Christophersen. Political Psychology 33/6 (2012), pp. 825–838
- Cold Economic Warfare: CoCom and the Forging of Export Controls, 1948-1954. Dordrecht: Republic of Letters Publishing, 2009
- “Historiography without God: A Reply to Gregory”. History and Theory 47/4 (2008), pp. 520–532
- “Acts of God? Miracles and Scientific Explanation”. History and Theory 47/4 (2008), pp. 483–494
- “The Ideal Explanatory Text in History: A Plea for Ecumenism”. History and Theory 43/3 (2004), pp. 321–340
- “Far Out: International History in Norway”. Scandinavian Journal of History 20/3 (1995), pp. 167–183
- “Bringing It All Back Home or Another Side of Bob Dylan: Midwestern Isolationist”. Journal of American Studies 26/3 (1992), pp. 337–355
- “‘Selling Firearms to the Indians’: Eisenhower’s Export Control Policy, 1953-54”. Diplomatic History 15/2 (1991), pp. 221–244
- “‘Economic Warfare’ and ‘Strategic Goods’: A Conceptual Framework for Analyzing COCOM”. Journal of Peace Research 28/2 (1991), pp. 191–204
- “An Act of Economic Warfare? The Dispute over NATO's Embargo Resolution, 1950-1951”. The International History Review 12/3 (1990), pp. 490–513
