= National Center for Research in Economic Education =

Economics research center at the University of Nebraska–Lincoln

Coordinates: 40°49′14″N 96°42′2″W

The National Center for Research in Economic Education (NCREE) was a non-profit economics research center located at the University of Nebraska–Lincoln in Lincoln, Nebraska. It was established in 1984 under the direction of professor William Walstead as part of the school's College of Business Administration (now the College of Business). The NCREE's researchers were typically students in the College of Business seeking an advanced degree.

The center's primary function was to assist researchers and other organizations with research, assessment, and evaluation projects in economics education. The NCREE designed, developed, and revised widely used standardized test instruments for assessing the economics knowledge of students at various stages of education, including the Basic Economics Test, Test of Economic Knowledge, Test of Economic Literacy, and Test of Understanding in College Economics. These tests are published by the Nebraska chapter of the National Council for Economic Education.

NCREE housed the Research in Economic Education Data Base, a comprehensive data base of research and tests developed by the center.

In 2024, the National Center for Research in Economic Education was eliminated in a wave of budget cuts across the University of Nebraska system. At the time of its closure, NCREE had no full-time faculty, and student interest had been limited for years. NU regents retained the option for College of Business students to undertake projects started by NCREE as a specialization or minor.
