= Basic Economics Test =

Standardized test of economics

The Basic Economics Test (BET) is a standardized test of economics nationally norm-referenced in the United States for use in the upper-grade levels of elementary schools. It is one of four grade-level specific standardized economics tests (i.e., Test of Economic Knowledge (TEK), Test of Economic Literacy (TEL) and Test of Understanding in College Economics (TUCE)) sponsored and published by the National Council on Economic Education (NCEE).

The BET was recently revised into its third edition in 2007 and will soon be available, along with an examiner’s manual, for teachers, school administrators and researchers through the NCEE. The revision process took place at the National Center for Research in Economic Education (NCREE) and included a new set of norm-references that consisted of teacher and student participation from twenty-three U.S. states. The BET has two parallel forms, each with thirty four-option multiple-choice items with content validity based on the Voluntary National Content Standards in Economics.
