= Financial Engineering News =

- Editor: Jim Finnegan
- Categories: financial engineering
- Frequency: Bimonthly
- Circulation: 8,500
- Publisher: Cusp Communications Group
- First issue: August 1997
- Final issue: 2007
- Country: USA
- Based in: Waltham, MA
- Language: English
- Website: fenews.com
- ISSN: 1092-6380

Financial Engineering News (FEN) was a bimonthly print and digital magazine publication of financial engineering-related news. A biweekly email newsletter, Financial Engineering Today was also published.

In 1996, Financial Engineering News was established by Dr. Jim Clark. It was published by Stonebridge Center Publishers' in Issaquah, WA, through 2000. FEN was acquired in 2001 by Jim Finnegan, CFA, and was owned by Cusp Communications Group. Under the ownership of the Cusp Communications Group, FEN expanded from an eight-page tabloid format to a bimonthly magazine averaging 54 pages per issue. Circulation was quadrupled and its website traffic increased tenfold.

Financial Engineering News was a newspaper devoted to reporting on the news, events, people, significant innovations, debates, and issues in the field of quantitative finance; as it applies to the real-world of investment management, insurance, investment banking, commercial banking, financial regulation, and corporate finance. It was published between the years of 1996 and 2007. By 2007 global circulation was approximately 18,000 for the print/digital magazine and 25,000 for the weekly e-mail newsletter Financial Engineering Today (or FET).

== Readership ==
The readership included a high proportion of professionals who had earned or were in the process of earning the CFA (Chartered Financial Analyst), FRM (Global Association of Risk Professionals), and PRM (Professional Risk Managers International Association) and Society of Actuaries (SOA) accreditations, and readers who worked for commercial enterprises in the areas of risk management, asset management, financial analysis, trading (stock/bond/commodities/derivatives), corporate finance, and financial product development.

FEN was an independent publication with no affiliation to any professional association. The readers were financial professionals with undergraduate and often master's degrees (typically an MBA or MS in Finance). They were not exclusively Ph.D.’s in their field: it was written for financial professionals and managers who relied upon the techniques and concepts of quantitative finance in their professional careers, have a background in this area, but were looking for commercially relevant and accessible ideas, tools, news, insights, techniques and concepts that could be put to use in their jobs without the theoretical math.

== Suspension of publication ==
In January 2007, the publisher of FEN (Cusp Communications Group) announced publication would be suspended after the Jan/Feb 2007 issue. The publication was shut down due to the general decline in print advertising which affected all print publications. The publication had been a "free to qualified professionals" publication. The copyrights to back issues and all other assets associated with FEN continue to be owned by Jim Finnegan.
