= Consumer math =

Consumer math comprises practical mathematical techniques used in commerce and everyday life. In the United States, consumer math is typically offered in high schools, some elementary schools, or in some colleges which grant associate's degrees.

A U.S. consumer math course might include a review of elementary arithmetic, including fractions, decimals, and percentages. Elementary algebra is often included as well, in the context of solving practical business problems. The practical applications typically include: changing money, checking accounts, budgeting, price discounts, markups and markdowns, payroll calculations, investing (simple and compound interest), taxes, consumer and business credit, and mortgages.

The emphasis in these courses is on computational skills and their practical application, with practical application being predominant. For instance, while computational formulas are covered in the material on interest and mortgages, the use of prepared tables based on those formulas is also presented and emphasized.

== See also ==
- Business mathematics
- Financial literacy

== Bibliography ==
- Brechner, Robert. (2006). Contemporary Mathematics for Business and Consumers, Thomson South-Western. ISBN 0-324-30455-2
- T. R. Ittelson, (2009), "Financial Statements", Career Press, 2009.
