= Statmetrics =

Software application

- Developer: Alex Vinnitschenko
- Stable release: 0.1
- Written in: Java
- Operating system: cross-platform
- Available in: English
- Type: Technical analysis software
- License: Proprietary EULA
- Website: www.statmetrics.org

Statmetrics is a free cross-platform software application providing an interactive environment for computational finance.

== Overview ==
Statmetrics is an analytical tool which offers several modeling techniques to analyze selected markets and integrates widely implemented quantitative finance technologies in addition to contemporary econometric analysis methods.

Statmetrics can be used in diverse fields to perform econometric analysis, technical analysis, risk management, portfolio management and asset allocation.

== See also ==
- Econometrics
- Technical analysis
- Computational finance
