= European Joint Master degree in Economics =

The European Joint Master degree in Economics provides a rigorous education in fundamental quantitative tools by combining economic theory with related quantitative disciplines such as Econometrics, Finance, Actuarial Science, Probability, Statistics, Mathematical Modeling, Computation and Simulation, Experimental Design, and Political Science, managed by consortia of higher education institutions from the European Union.

The first European Joint Master degree in Economics was the Erasmus Mundus QEM - Models and Methods of Quantitative Economics. It was approved by the European Union in 2006 as international graduate degree program designed by a Consortium of European Universities. The number of European universities or institutions making up a consortium varies from the degree awarding program. The nature of the degree differs from other master's degree in Economics or finance. Compared to the Master of Finance or Master of Economics, this European degree is joint and prepares graduate for a wide range of careers which utilize their competency in economics, including economic theory, macroeconomics and financial forecasting, financial engineering and risk management, quantitative asset management, computational economics, quantitative trading, and applied and theoretical research. Unlike programs which are substantially quantitative, this degree provide a merge of both theory and empirics useful in practice.

Closely related degrees include the "Master of Quantitative Finance and Economics" and "Master of Finance and Economics".

Often, the degree prepares graduates for both research orientation for further studies and in the job market for positions in government organizations, private companies or financial institutions. This joint degree is officially recognized as a master degree in each university and each country with the same rights and duties with the national degree.

The degree is gaining in recognition as graduate placements have increased over the past few years.

== Structure ==
European Joint Master degree in Economics is usually two years in duration, and typically include a thesis, an internship or research component. The programs require a bachelor's degree or an equivalent qualification at the same level, i.e. 180 ECTS credits in the European Credit Transfer and Accumulation System prior to admission. A typical requirement is exposure to economics, mathematics, applied mathematics, quantitative economics or finance. Like many master programs in Economics or finance, a review of statistics, probability theory, linear algebra and calculus are provided as a preliminary course. The curriculum is distributed between theory, applications, and simulations, with the emphasis on each differing by university in the consortium. The degree programs are usually funded by the Erasmus Mundus Scholarship.

== List of European Joint Master degree Programs in Economics ==
The list of programs awarding this joint degree are as follows:

- EMLE - European Master in Law and Economics
- EMIN - Erasmus Mundus Joint Master in Economics and Management of Network Industries
- EPOG - Master's Course - Economic Policies in the age of Globalisation : knowledge, finance and development
- MEGEI - MA Economics of Globalisation and European Integration
- QEM - Erasmus Mundus Models and Methods of Quantitative Economics

== List of Participating Institutions ==
Here are some institutions among consortium of universities offering the European Joint Master degree in Economics:

- Université Paris 1 Panthéon-Sorbonne, Paris, France
- Universidad Autónoma de Barcelona Barcelona, Spain
- SGH Warsaw School of Economics, Warsaw, Poland
- Università Ca' Foscari Venezia, Venice, Italy
- Comillas Pontifical University, Madrid, Spain
- Technische Universiteit Delft, The Netherlands
- University of Paris-Sud, France
- Florence School of Regulation of the European University Institute (Italy)
- Catholic University of Leuven, Belgium
- Università di Bologna, Italy
- Université d'Aix-Marseille, France
