= HSC Economics =

The Higher School Certificate (HSC) Economics course is a 2-unit elective course undertaken by students in New South Wales, Australia, across their final 2 years of schooling. The course includes a preliminary program for study across 3 terms of Year 11, and an HSC course for study over 4 terms of Year 12. In 2012, 5,262 students sat the HSC Economics external examination, with 12.5% receiving the top performance indicator of a Band 6. The course aims to take a "problems and issues approach" to the teaching and learning of economics, with a particular emphasis on the economic problems and issues experienced by individuals and society.

The key issues of the HSC Economics syllabus are:

- Economic growth
- Quality of life
- Unemployment
- Inflation
- External stability
- Distribution of income
- Environmental sustainability

== Preliminary course ==
The focus of the Preliminary course is on the practical problems and issues that affect individuals, firms and governments, whilst also introducing core microeconomic and macroeconomic principles to students. The content of the Preliminary Course includes the topics:

- Introduction to Economics
- Consumers and Business
- Markets
- Labour markets
- Financial Markets
- Government and the Economy

== HSC course ==
In the HSC course, the problems and issues are studied in relation to the national, regional and global economies, and are in a much higher level of depth. The HSC course consists of four topics (of greater length than in the Preliminary Course). Also included in Topic 1 is a case study of an economy other than Australia, and the impact of globalisation on that economy, along with economic policies used. The most popular topics for this case study are China, Indonesia, and Brazil.

The four topics studied in the HSC course are:

- The Global Economy
- Australia's Role in the Global Economy
- Economic Issues
- Economic Policies and Management

The HSC examination allows 3 hours and encompasses the following items:

- Sect I (20 marks): Twenty objective response (multiple choice) questions mostly examining definitions, basic economic calculations, and the application of basic economic analysis and reasoning skills.
- Sect 2 (40 marks): Four short answer questions (in parts, with questions ranging from 1 to 6 marks) examining all parts of the content, sometimes encompassing stimulus material.
- Sect 3 (20 marks): Students choose from one of two extended response questions, based on stimulus material provided. Expected length of 800–1100 words.
- Sect 4 (20 marks): Students choose from one of two extended response questions. Expected length of 800–1100 words

== Textbooks ==
Three textbooks are updated and published annually, each covering the current 2009 Economics syllabus for the HSC programme:

- Year 12 Economics, Tim Riley (Tim Riley Publications)
- Australia in the Global Economy, Tim Dixon and John Mahony (Pearson Australia)
- Updated Economics (tri-annual publication), John Bulmer (David Barlow Publishing)

== See also ==
- Economics education § Curriculum
