= Quality Reform =

2002 reform of Norwegian higher education

The Quality Reform was a reform initialized by the Norwegian Ministry of Education and Research after recommendation from the Mjøs committee (1998–2000). It was introduced in 2002–03 and changed the entire system of higher education in Norway to comply with the Bologna process. This process is intended to take place throughout Europe to better integrate the higher educations systems, and Norway is among the first to implement this process. The Norwegian approach was a quick and brutal removal of the old system and replacement to the new instantly.

The main changes included a switch from the old system of Latin degrees to the international Bachelor, Master and Philosophiae Doctor degrees. This replaced the former system of three and a half or four year cand.mag. degrees followed by one and a half or two year hovedfag degrees. The system abolished many old master-level degree titles, including cand.scient. (sciences), cand.polit. (social sciences), cand.philol. (humanities), cand.oecon. (economics), cand.agro. (agronomy), cand.jur. (law), cand.theol. (theology), sivilingeniør (engineering) and siviløkonom (management). The length varied, and depended on the area of study, ranging from four to six years. The cand.psychol. (clinical psychology), cand.med. (medicine) and cand.med.vet. titles have been retained as six-year studies in clinical psychology, medicine and veterinary medicine. All master-level titles are now awarded as Master of Science, Master of Technology or Master of Philosophy, all taking five years.

Other changed included replacing the former number scale (from 1.0 to 4.0) grades to A to F letter scale, reducing the number of passing grades from 41 to five. It also changed the former system credits of vekttall (with nominal 10 vekttall per semester) to the European Credit Transfer System (ECTS) with nominal 30 credits per semester. The reform set new requirements to the follow-up on students, forcing universities and colleges to spend more resources per credit, specially on demands related to assignments.

== Degree List ==
- cand.mag. (arts)
- cand.scient. (sciences)
- cand.real. (mathematics)
- cand.polit. (social sciences)
- cand.philol. (humanities)
- cand.oecon. (economics)
- cand.jur. (law)
- cand.theol. (theology)
- cand.psychol. (clinical psychology)
- cand.med. (medicine)
- cand.med.vet. (medicine veterinary)
- cand.agro. (agronomy)
- siv.ing. (engineering)
- siv.ek. (management)

== See also ==
Bolgna Process
