= Test of Economic Literacy =

The Test of Economic Literacy or TEL is a standardized test of economics nationally norm-referenced in the United States for use in upper-grade levels of high schools. The first edition was released in 1977 and the fourth edition was released in 2013. It is one of four grade-level specific standardized economics tests (i.e., Basic Economics Test (BET), Test of Economic Knowledge (TEK) and Test of Understanding in College Economics (TUCE)) sponsored and published by the National Council on Economic Education (NCEE). The TEL has two parallel forms, each composed of forty-five 4-option multiple-choice items with content validity based on the Voluntary National Content Standards in Economics.
