= Master of Quantitative Finance =

Master's degree focused on the discipline of quantitative analysis of financial markets

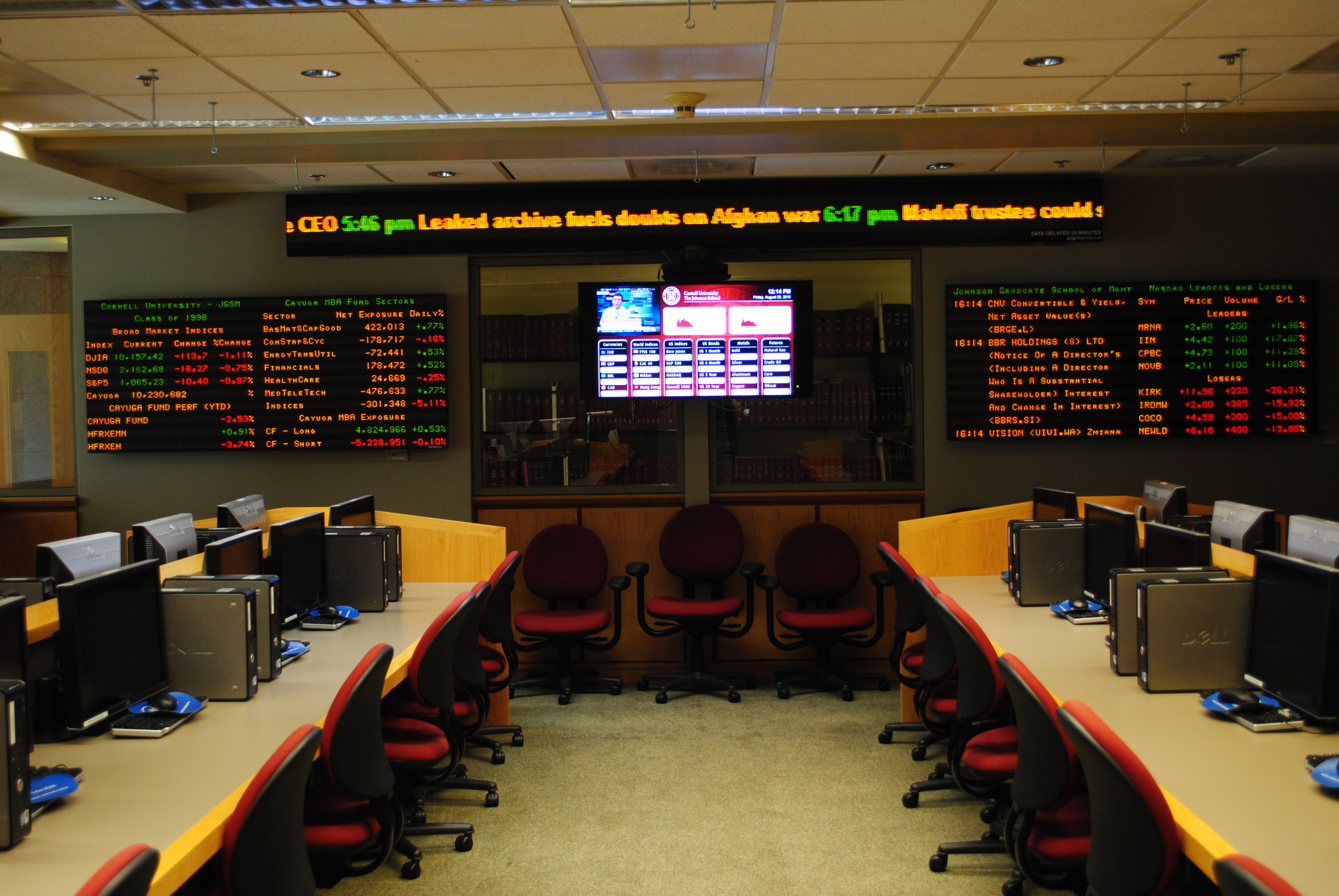
Trading room simulator, Johnson-Cornell

A master's degree in quantitative finance is a postgraduate degree focused on the application of mathematical methods to the solution of problems in financial economics. There are several like-titled degrees which may further focus on financial engineering, computational finance, mathematical finance, or financial risk management.

In general, these degrees aim to prepare students for roles as "quants" (quantitative analysts); in particular, these degrees emphasize derivatives and fixed income, and the hedging and management of the resultant market and credit risk.

Formal master's-level training in quantitative finance has existed since 1990.

== Structure ==
The program is usually one to one and a half years in duration, and may include a thesis component. Entrance requirements are generally multivariable calculus, linear algebra, differential equations and some exposure to computer programming (usually C++); programs emphasizing financial mathematics may require some background in measure theory.

Initially, the curriculum builds quantitative skills, and simultaneously develops the underlying finance theory:

- The quantitative component draws on applied mathematics, computer science and statistical modelling, and emphasizes stochastic calculus, numerical methods and simulation techniques; see Mathematical finance § Mathematical tools. Some programs also focus on econometrics / time series analysis.
- The theory component usually includes a formal study of financial economics, addressing asset pricing and financial markets; some programs may also include general coverage of economics, accounting, corporate finance and portfolio management.

The components are then integrated, addressing the modelling, valuation and hedging of equity derivatives, commodity derivatives, foreign exchange derivatives, and fixed income instruments and their related credit- and interest rate derivatives; see Mathematical finance § Derivatives pricing.

Programs often include dedicated modules in market risk and credit risk, with some degrees offered as specialized "Masters in Financial Risk Management"; the techniques covered are value at risk, stress testing, and "sensitivities" analysis, and in parallel, the Basel capital / liquidity requirements. Increasingly, programs include quantitative portfolio management and -optimization; see Outline of finance § Quantitative investing and § Portfolio theory. Recently, topics (or specializations) in data science and machine learning are becoming common.

The title of the degree will depend on emphasis, the major differences between programs being the curriculum's distribution between mathematical theory, quantitative techniques and financial applications. The more theoretically oriented degrees are usually termed "Master's in Mathematical Finance" or "Master's in Financial Mathematics" while those oriented toward practice are termed "Master's in Financial Engineering" (MFE or MSFE), "Master's in Computational Finance" (MCF or MSCF), or sometimes simply "Master's in Finance" (MFin). "Master's in Quantitative Finance" is the more general degree title, although "MQF" degrees are often less theoretical and more practical. The practice oriented programs are often positioned as professional degrees (and in the United States, are sometimes offered as Professional Science Master's). Programs are sometimes offered as a Master of Engineering, or as a Master of Operations Research. In a few cases, a quantitative-finance MBA-specialization is offered.

== Comparison with other qualifications ==
The program differs from a Master of Science in Finance (MSF) and an MBA in finance in that these degrees aim to produce finance generalists as opposed to "quants" and therefore focus on corporate finance, accounting, equity valuation and portfolio management. The treatment of any common topics—usually "derivatives", financial modeling, and risk management—will be less (or even non) technical. Entrance requirements are similarly less mathematical. Note that Master of Finance (M.Fin.) and MSc. in Finance degrees, as distinct from the MSF, may be substantially similar to the MQF.

There is some overlap with degrees in actuarial science, and both degrees are occasionally offered by the same department. Nevertheless, the programs are almost always separate and distinct. Specifically, whereas actuarial programs cover risk and uncertainty as applied to pensions, insurance and investments, quantitative finance programs are broader (although offer less depth in these areas), and prepare graduates for various of the highly numerate roles in finance and for other areas that require "quants".

There is similarly overlap with a Master of Financial Economics, although the emphasis is very different. That degree focuses on the underlying economics, and on developing and testing theoretical models, and aims to prepare graduates for research based roles and for doctoral study. The curriculum therefore emphasises coverage of financial theory, and of econometrics, while the treatment of model implementation (through mathematical modeling and programming), while important, is secondary. Entrance requirements are similarly less mathematical. Some Financial Economics degrees are substantially quantitative, and are largely akin to the MQF.

For students whose interests in finance are commercial rather than academic, a Master's in Quantitative Finance may be seen as an alternative to a PhD in finance. At the same time though, "Master's in Mathematical Finance" programs are often positioned as providing a basis for doctoral study.

== History ==
In 1989 Cornell University's Operations Research and Information Engineering department hosted the first ever academic meeting to focus on financial engineering, which led to the development of the first research journal in the field, Mathematical Finance. The first quantitative finance master's programs in the US were offered by Illinois Institute of Technology in 1990, under Michael Ong. The programs offered were the "Master of Science in Quantitative Finance" and "Master of Science in Financial Markets and Trading", and were combined in 2008 to become the "Master of Science in Finance, with Financial Engineering Concentration".

The NYU-Poly Financial Engineering degree was the second program of its kind, and the first to be certified by the International Association of Financial Engineers. Carnegie Mellon introduced its "Master of Computational Finance" program in 1994. OGI's Computational Finance Program (1996, now discontinued) was the first such program based in a computer science department. Other pioneering programs include those at NYU's Courant Institute, Columbia, Princeton, Cornell, UCLA, DePaul and MIT. The program in Quantitative Finance is also popular in the DACH region with renowned programs at Vienna University of Economics and Business, ETH Zurich (together with University of Zurich), and University of St. Gallen.

Subsequent growth in the number and location of programs has paralleled the growth of financial engineering—with its growing importance across all aspects of the financial services industries—and of risk management as professions. Programs are now widely offered internationally—see links below—and in some cases are available online or via distance education (e.g. Washington, York, Stevens, USC, NUS, TU Kaiserslautern,). More recently undergraduate programs are available, both in the US (e.g. Ball State, James Madison, and McIntire.) and internationally (e.g. Essex, HKUST, and UNISA).

== See also ==
- Certificate in Quantitative Finance
- Financial modeling
- List of quantitative analysts
- Master of Finance
- Master of Financial Economics
- Mathematical finance
- QEM
- Quantitative analyst
- Context:
  - Outline of finance § Education
  - Quantitative analysis (finance) § Education
  - Financial engineering § Education
