= Candidate (degree) =

Nomenclature of academic degree in various countries

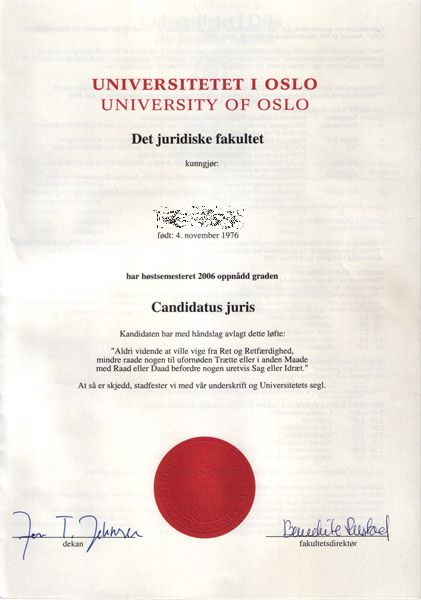
A Candidate of Law (Candidatus juris) diploma from the University of Oslo

Candidate (Latin: candidatus or candidata) is the name of various academic degrees, which are today mainly awarded in Scandinavia and Eastern Europe. The degree title was phased out in much of Europe through the 1999 Bologna Process, which has re-formatted academic degrees in Europe.

The degrees are now, or were once, awarded in the Nordic countries, the Soviet Union, the Netherlands, and Belgium. In Scandinavia and the Nordic countries, a candidate degree is a higher professional-level degree which corresponds to five to seven years of studies. In the Soviet states, a candidate degree was a research degree roughly equivalent to a Doctor of Philosophy degree. In the Netherlands and Belgium, it was an undergraduate first-cycle degree roughly comparable with the bachelor's degree.

== Etymology and origins ==
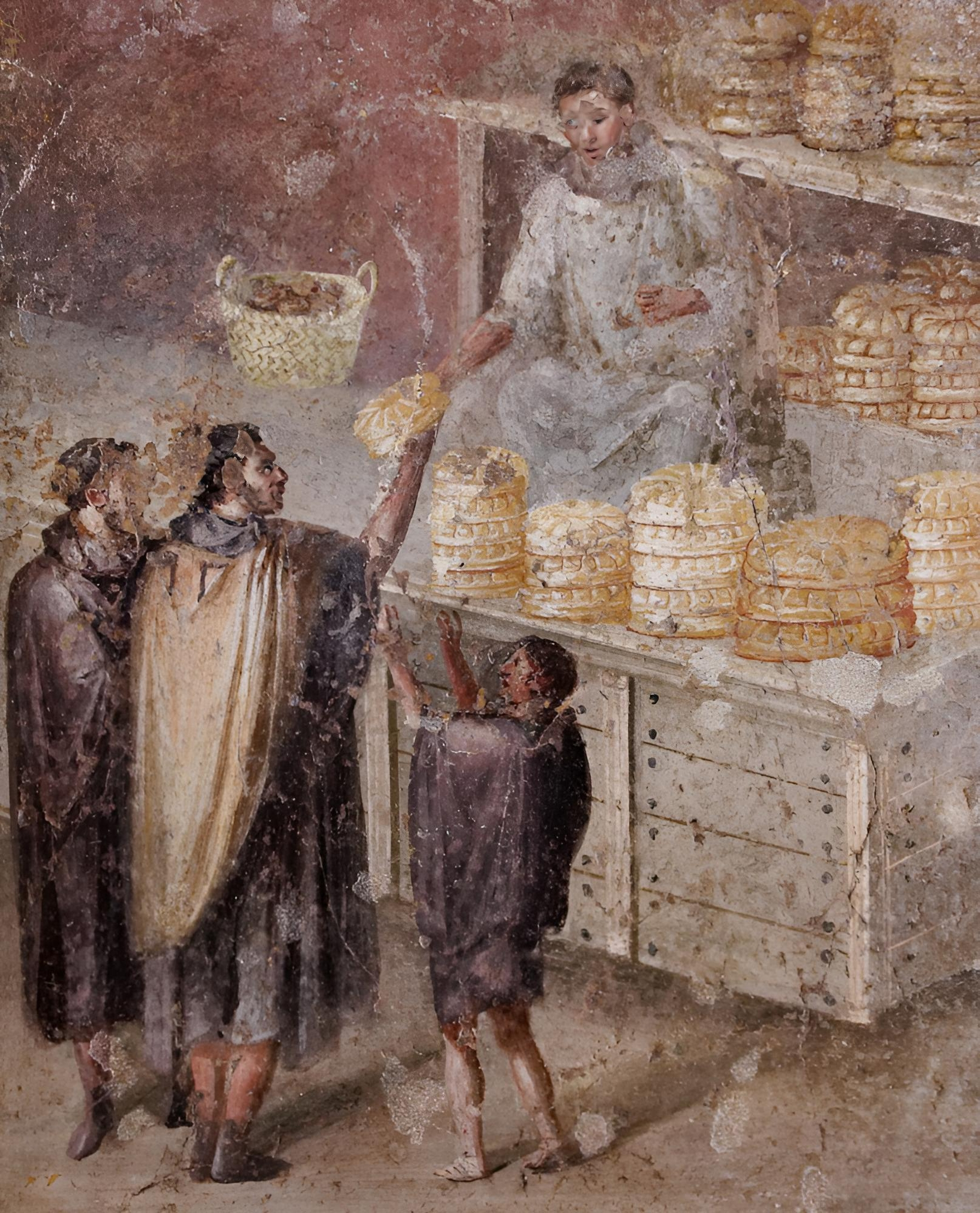
A fresco from Pompeii depicting a candidate for office, or perhaps an elected official, wearing the white toga candida while distributing bread.

The term is derived from the Latin candida, meaning white. In Ancient Rome, men running for political office would typically wear togas chalked and bleached to be bright white at speeches, debates, conventions, and other public functions. The term candidate thus came to mean someone who seeks an office of some sort.

Today, the degrees continue to be referred to by their Latin title (candidatus for men, candidata for women), with both male and female degree recipients being called candidates in English. The degree titles are typically abbreviated; for example, a Candidatus juris is commonly referred to as cand.jur.

== Use by region ==
=== Nordic region ===
In Scandinavia, the term was introduced in the early 18th century and initially referred to the higher degrees in theology, law, and medicine. A candidate's degree in the relevant field (e.g., Candidate of Law) was a requirement for appointment to higher offices in the state administration (embedded), including as priests, judges, other state officials, and physicians. In Denmark, Norway, and Sweden, the term "candidate" was eventually used for higher professional academic degrees, usually awarded after around five to seven years of studies. In Norway, only a few Candidate's degrees (such as Candidate of Theology, Candidate of Medicine, and Candidate of Psychology) are still awarded, while in Denmark and Sweden, all Candidate's degrees are retained.

In Denmark, educational reforms began in 1993 to make bachelor's and master's degrees commonly available as a two-step alternative to the Candidate's degree. Despite these reforms, the candidate degree was regarded as the standard academic qualification well into the 21st century. In 2010, the majority of students completing the required amount of studies necessary for a bachelor's degree continued with their studies to be awarded a candidate's degree, or equivalent, instead. Because most students continue to achieve this level of study, the labor market in Denmark does not respect bachelor's degrees as a first-cycle degree. Many institutions in Denmark which no longer offer the candidate degree as a result of the Bologna Process continue to offer joint bachelor-masters programs which last five years, just as the candidate degree had.

In Norway, the Quality Reform of 2003 enacted the nation's compliance with the Bologna process, and most candidates' degrees are no longer awarded for academic qualifications. A select number of professional programs, however, have been given an exception from the Bologna process, allowing candidates' degrees to continue to be awarded for specific six-year professional programs. As of 2023, the University of Oslo, for example, awards such professional degrees in medicine (cand.med.), psychology (cand.psychol.), and theology (cand.theol.).

=== The Low Countries ===
In the Netherlands and Belgium, the "Candidate's diploma" was an undergraduate first-cycle diploma that the university issued to students who passed their Candidate's examination. After obtaining the certificate, one was entitled to use the academic title Candidatus (prenominal abbreviation Cand.). This was the lowest academic degree that could be achieved in these countries, and is roughly comparable with the bachelor's degree (BA or BSc).

The candidate exam took place after the student completes a substantial and pre-determined part of their university education, in the case of a five-year or more prolonged course, typically after completion of the third year. Students in a four-year class received the degree at the end of their second or during their third year, depending on the criteria set by the institution. Candidate's degrees were phased out in the Netherlands in 1982 and have been largely replaced by the bachelor's degree with the introduction of the Bologna Process.

=== The Soviet Union ===
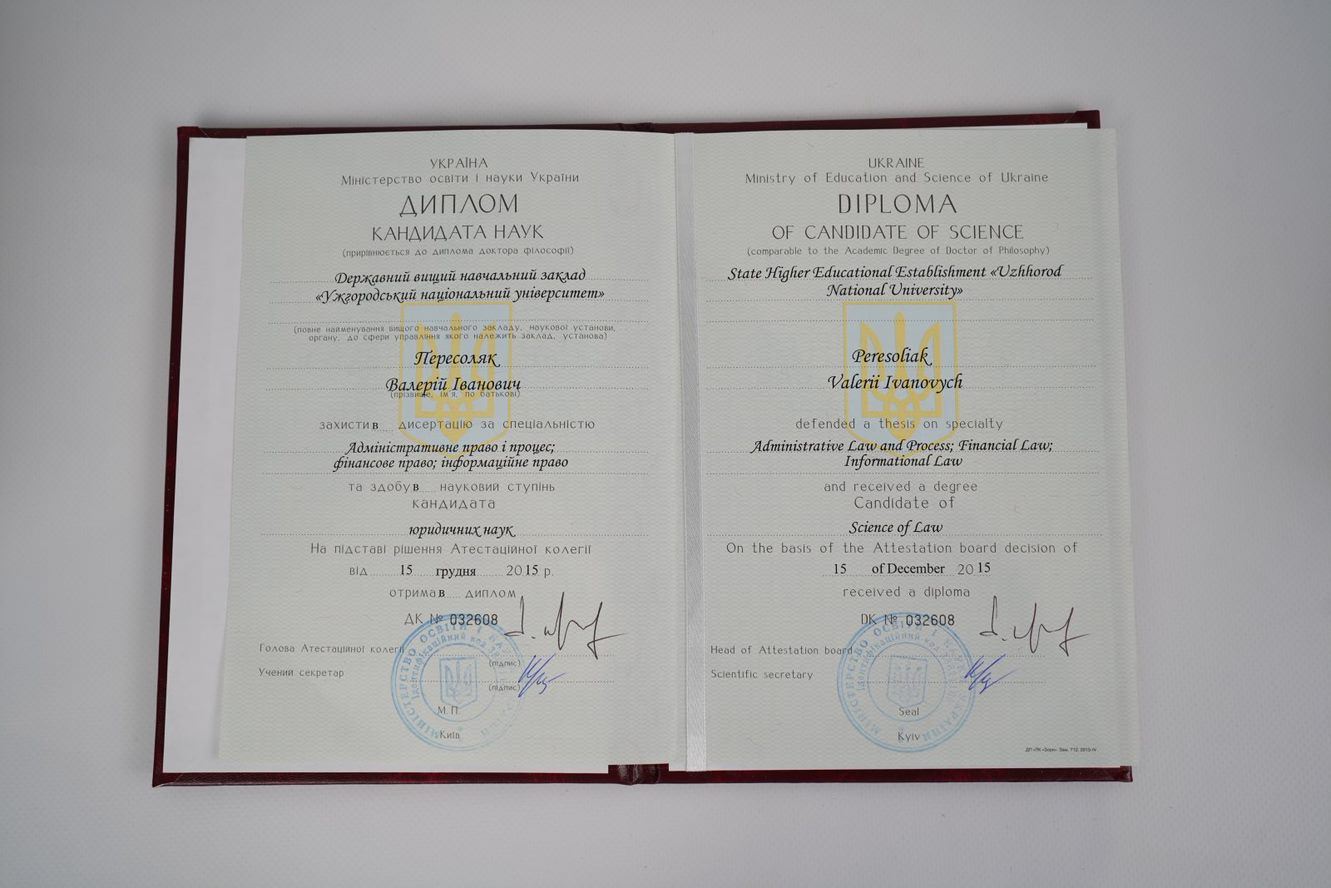
A Candidate of Science of Law diploma (Ukrainian: Диплом к.ю.н.) awarded by Uzhhorod National University in 2015

In the Soviet Union, candidate degrees were research degrees roughly equivalent to a Doctor of Philosophy. The degrees continue to be awarded in modern Russia and some East European countries which were formerly part of the Soviet Union.

== Degrees ==
=== Candidate of the Arts ===
A Candidate of the Arts (Latin: Candidatus/candidate magisterii; abbreviated as cand.mag) is an academic degree currently awarded in Denmark. The degree is officially translated into English as Master of Arts and requires five years of studies. It is not to be confused with the magister's degree (magister artium or magister Scientiarum), a degree requiring 7–8 years of studies with a strong emphasis on the scientific thesis, and which is the approximate equivalent of a PhD degree.

The degree was initially introduced in Denmark in 1883. For most of its history, the degree usually required between 4 and 5 years of studies. In its later years, the formal minimum requirement was 3.5 years for the faculties of mathematics and natural sciences, and 4–4.5 for the faculties of humanities and social sciences. Today, the degree is awarded only in humanities and requires five years of studies. The degree was also awarded in Norway beginning in 1920, based on the Danish degree; since 2003, it is no longer awarded.

=== Candidate of Arts and Letters ===
A Candidate of Arts and Letters (Latin: Candidatus/candidata philologiae; abbreviated as cand. philol.) is an academic degree in Arts and Letters awarded in Denmark. It is considered an entry-level scientific degree for careers in academia (qualifying for positions as assistant professor or lecturer), as doctorates traditionally are awarded later in the job to senior academics. The degree was once awarded in Norway but had also been phased out by 2007. At the time, it typically required six years of study at Norwegian universities.

=== Candidate of Economics ===
A Candidate of Economics (Latin: Candidatus/candidata economics; abbreviated as cand.oecon.) is an academic degree in economics currently awarded in Denmark and formerly in Iceland and Norway. It is roughly equivalent to a Master of Economics.

The degree was introduced in Norway in 1905 as a supplementary academic degree in economics. The program usually lasted two years, was conferred by the Faculty of Law, University of Oslo and primarily intended for those already holding a cand.jur. degree. The cand.oecon. did not qualify its holder for higher civil servant positions. In 1934, it became an independent 5-year program in economics. The degree was replaced in Norway by the Bachelor/Master's degree system in 2003.

The degree was first made available at the University of Iceland in 1964 as a 4-year program in Business Administration at the Faculty of Economics and Business Administration. It was replaced in 1996 by the current bachelor's and master's of science programs.

=== Candidate of Information Technology ===
A Candidate of Information Technology (Latin: Candidatus/candidata informationis technologiæ; abbreviated as cand. it.) is a graduate degree awarded in Denmark equivalent to a Master of Science in Information Technology. In Denmark, the title can be obtained at the IT University of Copenhagen and through It-vest (a collaboration between several Danish universities).

=== Candidate of Law ===
A Candidate of Law (Latin: candidates/candidate juris; abbreviated as cand.jur.) is both a graduate law degree awarded to law students in the Nordic region as well as an "academic status" designation for advanced Law School students in German-speaking countries.

==== In the Nordic countries ====
The Candidate of Law degree was once awarded in Denmark, Estonia, Finland, Iceland, Norway and Sweden. The application process to study for the degree was highly competitive throughout the Nordic region, as the qualifying exam to practice law could only be taken at a university, where the government officially granted the diploma privilege.

All Nordic countries—except Denmark—have changed their law degrees from the Candidate to a master's due to the Bologna Process. In Finland, the Oikeustieteen kandidaatti (abbreviated OTK; Swedish: Juris kandidatexamen, Jur. kand.) was replaced by Oikeustieteen maisteri (abbreviated OTM; Swedish: Juris magister, JM), which is obtained after five years of law studies (180 + 120 ECTS). Those previously granted a candidate of law diploma could continue using their previous title in Finland. In Iceland, the Embættispróf í lögfræði (cand. jur.) degree has been replaced by the ML í lögfræði (mag. jur.) title. In Norway, the cand.jur. was formally replaced in 2003 by the Master i Rettsvitenskap master's degree, which is obtained after five years of law studies equivalent to 300 ECTS. The last cand. jur. degrees were awarded in Norway in the spring of 2007. In Sweden, the Jurist kandidatexamen (jur. kand.) degree was replaced by Juristexamen in 2010, which is completed after four-and-a-half years of studying at the average pace (270 ECTS). Previously graduated jur. kand. diploma holders were eligible to continue using their title before and after the Bologna process; the academic degree is split into two different diplomas. Previously, the lower degree was Varanotaari, abbreviated VN (Swedish: Vicenotarie), and current lower degree Oikeusnotaari, shortened ON (Swedish: Rättsnotarie, RN) is awarded after completing three years of study (180 ECTS). Before the Soviet occupation, a post-graduate law degree was awarded as a cand.jur. in Estonia. President Konstantin Päts, for example, held a cand. jur. degree from the University of Tartu. The use of the candidate system in Estonia is tied to the colonial influence of the nordic counties, especially Denmark.. In Estonia, the current post-graduate law degree is Õigusteaduse magister.

In Denmark, the Juridisk kandidateksamen (cand. jur.) is obtained after five years of law studies (180 + 120 ECTS). Undergraduate degree is Bachelor i jura (bac. jur.) which usually take three years to complete (180 ECTS).

==== In Germany, Austria, and Switzerland ====
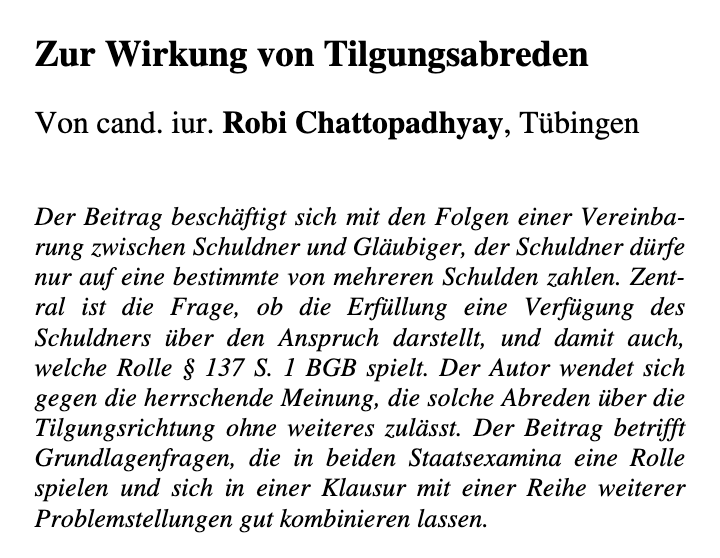
Example of the use of the denomination in the context of a journal publication by an advanced German Law School student (ZJS 2/2010, p. 148)

In Germany, Austria, and Switzerland, the term "cand. iur." is a designation used in the academic environment by advanced law students. However, it is not an academic degree. Instead, the designation is used in an internal university context or the context of publications, for example, contributions to journals or anthologies. The designation is usually obtained after successful completion of the intermediate examination (after 4 to 6 semesters) and roughly corresponds to the qualification level of a Bachelor of Laws. Before passing the intermediate examination, law students shall use the designation "stud. iur." (studiosus iuris).

In Germany, law school is completed with the passing of the First Law Examination after 4–6 years of study. Subsequently, graduates can be addressed as "Ref. iur." (Rechtsreferendar) or "Jurist Univ." Some law faculties also award the academic degrees "Diplom-Jurist", "Diplom-Jurist (Univ.)" or "Mag. iur."

In Austria, the degree program ends with a diploma examination, and the academic degree "Mag. iur." is awarded.

In Switzerland, the designation "cand. iur. is no longer common since the Bologna reform has changed the degree program to the Bachelor's and Master's system so that the academic degrees "BLaw" (Bachelor of Law) are awarded after three years and "MLaw" (Master of Law) after further two years of study. The academic degree "lic. iur." was abolished during the Bologna reform. In the undergraduate BLaw program, students generally use the designation "stud. our."

=== Candidate of Mathematics and the Natural Sciences ===
A Candidate of Mathematics and the Natural Sciences (Latin: Candidatus/candidate realism; abbreviated as cand. real.) is a former academic degree used in Norway and conferred in mathematics and natural sciences. It was abolished in 1985. There was originally no set duration for the completion of this degree, although 7–8 years was normal, and including a dissertation which usually took between 2 and 4 years to complete. As of 1985, the formal requirement amounted to 6 years of studies and dissertation work, although there was a strong tradition for extensive dissertations, leading many students to take longer. The degree is sometimes translated as PhD.

=== Candidate of Medicine ===
A Candidate of Medicine (Latin: Candidatus/candidata medicinae; abbreviated as cand. med.) is an academic degree awarded in Denmark, Iceland, and Norway following a six-year medical school education. Medical students in Germany, Austria, and Switzerland carry this title during their medical studies before being awarded the degree of Dr. med. (Germany) or Dr. med. univ. (Austria) after defending a doctoral or diploma thesis before a jury. Along with candidate degrees in veterinary medicine, psychology, and theology, it is one of the few Latin degree titles still awarded in Norway.

=== Candidate of Political Science ===
A Candidate of Political Science (Latin: Candidatus/candidata scientiarum politicarum; abbreviated as cand.scient.pol.) is an academic degree in political science, awarded by several Danish universities. The degree historically required six years of study, but currently requires five. The current five-year degree is equivalent to, and is translated into English as, a Master of Science in political science. Until 2008, the equivalent degree was awarded in Norway as a cand.polit. degree.

=== Candidate of Politics ===
A Candidate of Economics (Latin: Candidatus/candidata politices; abbreviated as cand.polit.) is an academic degree in economics, currently only awarded in Denmark. In Denmark, cand.polit. refers exclusively to the Candidate's economics degree awarded by the University of Copenhagen. Economics degrees from other Danish universities are known as cand. oecon and cand. merc.

In Norway, the cand.polit. was formerly awarded an academic degree in all social sciences, including economics, psychology, sociology, and political science. It normally requires at least six years of study, although many students extend this period. At the time of its abolition, the cand.polit. degree was in practice a two-year or a two-and-a-half-year extension to the four-year cand.mag. degree or equivalent qualifications. Following the Quality Reform of 2003, it has been replaced by a Master of Philosophy degree, shortening the nominal study time from six to five years.

=== Candidate of Psychology ===
A Candidate of Psychology (Latin: candidatus/candidata psychologiae; abbreviated as cand. psych or cand.psychol) is an academic degree in Psychology currently awarded in Denmark and Norway. In Denmark, the degree is awarded by the University of Copenhagen, Aarhus University, University of Southern Denmark, and Aalborg University. In Norway the degree is awarded by the University of Oslo, the Norwegian University of Science and Technology, the University of Bergen, and the University of Tromsø. In scope and length, it is equivalent to a degree somewhere between a master's and a doctorate in clinical psychology.

It was introduced at the University of Copenhagen in 1944 and at the University of Oslo in 1948 based on the Danish degree. In Denmark, the degree requires five years of studies, while in Norway, it requires five years of academic studies and a one-year internship as part of the studies. As part of the Bologna Process, the degree in Denmark consists of a three-year bachelor's degree in psychology followed by a two-year master's degree in clinical psychology that gives the right to use the title cand.psych. Although completion of the degree qualifies the holder to apply for a license as a clinical psychologist, it does not in itself authorize the holder to practice clinical psychology. In Norway, after the final exam, those with a cand. Psychol. May apply for and will usually be granted the authorization to practice clinical psychology. In Denmark, two years of supervised practice is required before full approval.

=== Candidate of Science ===
A Candidate of Science (Latin: Candidatus/candidata Scientiarum; abbreviated as cand.scient.) is an academic degree currently awarded in Denmark and formerly awarded in Norway. It is roughly equivalent to a Master of Science degree.

In Denmark, cand.scient. is a higher-level degree awarded by Danish universities to graduate students in the mathematics and natural sciences. The study requires 120 ECTS, which normally requires two years of study and a completed bachelor's degree. In Norway, cand.scient. was a higher-level degree awarded in mathematics and natural sciences. It was introduced in 1985, replacing the more rigorous cand. real. degree. Completion required 1.5–2 years of study and a completed cand. mag. Degree of 3.5 years. In 2003, the cand.scient. degree was replaced in Norway by the Master of Science degree as part of the adoption of the Bologna Process.

=== Candidate of Theology ===
A Candidate of Theology (Latin: Candidatus/candidata theologiæ; abbreviated as cand. theol.) is an academic degree awarded after completion of a six-year higher education program in theology in Iceland, Denmark, and Norway. The title is protected by law in Denmark and Norway. In Denmark, the title is described as equivalent to Master of Theology, while in Norway, it ranks higher. In Norway, it is one of the few candidate degree titles to have remained after the Quality Reform of 2003. It can only be issued by four institutions: NLA University College, the University of Oslo, the MF Norwegian School of Theology, and VID Specialized University.

=== Candidate of Veterinary Medicine ===
A Candidate of Veterinary Medicine (Latin: Candidatus/candidata medicinae veterinariae; abbreviated as cand.med.vet) is an academic degree awarded in Scandinavian countries following a 5.5 to 6-year veterinary medical school education. Equivalent degrees in other countries qualify a student to practice as a veterinarian, such as a Master of Veterinary Science. The degree is awarded by the Norwegian University of Life Sciences in Norway, the University of Copenhagen in Denmark, and the Swedish University of Agricultural Sciences in Sweden—the only educational institutions in the Scandinavian countries to offer the veterinary degree. In Norway, the title is one of the few candidate degrees that has continued to be awarded after the Quality Reform 2003.

== See also ==
- siv.ing. (engineering)
- siv.ek. (management)
