= Test of Understanding in College Economics =

American standardized test

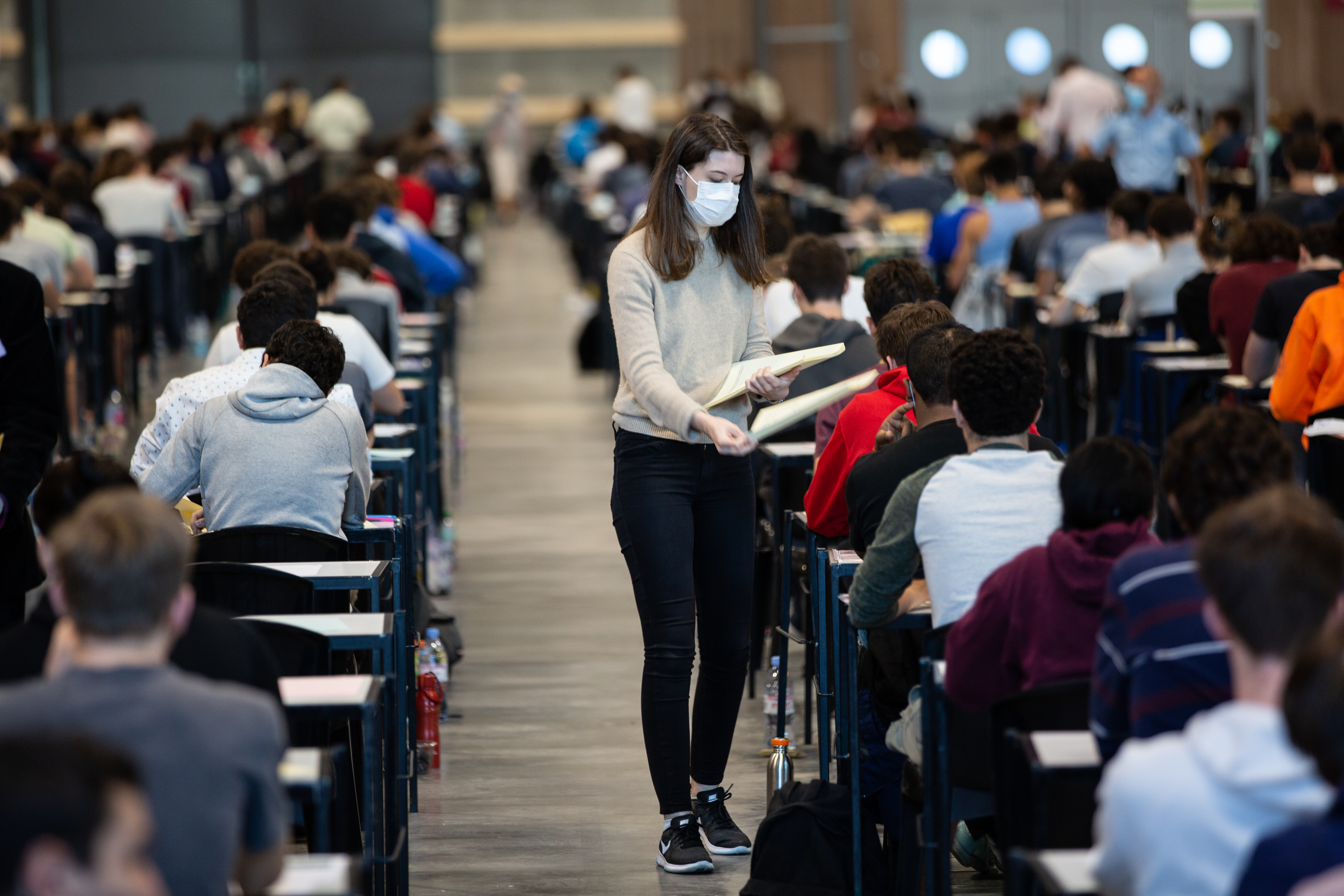
Administering exams

The Test of Understanding in College Economics or TUCE is a standardized test of economics used across the United States for over 50 years.

The test is nationally norm-referenced in the United States for use at the undergraduate level, primarily targeting introductory or principles-level coursework in economics. It is one of four grade-level specific standardized economics tests (i.e. Basic Economics Test (BET), Test of Economic Knowledge (TEK) and Test of Economic Literacy (TEL)) sponsored and published by the National Council on Economic Education (NCEE) .

As of 2007, TUCE was in its fourth edition and is available, along with an examiner’s manual, for instructors, school administrators and researchers through the NCEE. The latest revision process, a joint effort between the NCEE and the National Center for Research in Economic Education, included a national norming consisting of 70 institutions across the United States spanning the four largest categories of the Carnegie Classification of Institutions of Higher Education.

The TUCE has two forms, one covering microeconomics and one covering macroeconomics, each with thirty 4-option multiple-choice items. Each form includes three items covering international economics.

In a 2023 research study published in The American Economist, ChatGPT was asked to complete the TUCE and scored in the 91st percentile in microeconomics, and in the 99th percentile in macroeconomics.
