= Business mathematics =

Practical mathematics used in business

Business mathematics are mathematics used by commercial enterprises to record and manage business operations. Commercial organizations use mathematics in accounting, inventory management, marketing, sales forecasting, and financial analysis.

Mathematics typically used in commerce includes elementary arithmetic, elementary algebra, statistics and probability. For some management problems, more advanced mathematics - calculus, matrix algebra, and linear programming - may be applied.

== High school ==
Business mathematics, sometimes called commercial math or consumer math, is a group of practical subjects used in commerce and everyday life. In schools, these subjects are often taught to students who are not planning a university education. In the United States, they are typically offered in high schools and in schools that grant associate's degrees; elsewhere they may be included under business studies. These courses often fulfill the general math credit for high school students.

The emphasis in these courses is on computational skills and their practical application, with practice being predominant. A (U.S.) business math course typically includes a review of elementary arithmetic, including fractions, decimals, and percentages; elementary algebra is included also. The practical applications of these techniques include revenues, checking accounts, price discounts, markups, payroll calculations, simple and compound interest, consumer and business credit, and mortgages.

== University level ==
=== Undergraduate ===
Business mathematics comprises mathematics credits taken at an undergraduate level by business students. The course is often organized around the various business sub-disciplines, including the above applications, and usually includes a separate module on interest calculations; the mathematics itself comprises mainly algebraic techniques. Many programs, as mentioned, extend to more sophisticated mathematics. Common credits are Business Calculus and Business Statistics. Programs may also cover matrix operations, as above. At many US universities, business students (instead) study "finite mathematics", a course combining several applicable topics, including basic probability theory, an introduction to linear programming, some theory of matrices, and introductory game theory; the course sometimes includes a high level treatment of calculus.

Since these courses are focused on problems from the business world, the syllabus is then adjusted re standard courses in the mathematics or science fields. The calculus course especially emphasizes differentiation, leading to optimization of costs and revenue. Integration is less emphasized, as its business applications are fewer — used here in some interest calculations, and for (theoretically) aggregating costs and / or revenue — and it is more technically demanding. Relatedly, in a regular calculus course students study trigonometric functions, whereas business calculus courses often omit them. As regards formal theory, as these are applied courses, very few proofs or derivations are included, unlike in standard courses. (Although see Bachelor of Science in Business Administration and Bachelor of Business Science.) Intermediate or college algebra is often the only prerequisite for a business calculus course. The statistics syllabus, similarly of an applied nature, is described under that article.

Note that economics majors, especially those planning to pursue graduate study in the field, are encouraged to instead take regular calculus, as well as linear algebra and other advanced math courses, especially real analysis. Some economics programs (instead) include a module in "mathematics for economists", providing a bridge between the above "Business Mathematics" courses and mathematical economics and econometrics. Programs in management accounting, operations management, risk management and credit management, may similarly include supplementary coursework in relevant quantitative techniques, generally regression, and often linear programming as above, as well as other optimization techniques and various probability topics.

=== Postgraduate ===
At the postgraduate level, generalist management and finance programs include quantitative topics which are foundational for the study in question - often exempting students with an appropriate background. These are usually "interest mathematics" and statistics, both at the above level. MBA programs often also include basic operations research (linear programming, as above) with the emphasis on practice, and may combine the topics as "quantitative analysis"; MSF programs may similarly cover applied / financial econometrics.

More technical Master's in these areas, such as those in management science and in quantitative finance, will entail a deeper, more theoretical study of operations research and econometrics, and extend to further advanced topics such as mathematical programming, Monte Carlo methods, and stochastic calculus. These programs, then, do not include or entail "Business mathematics" per se.

Where mathematical economics is not a degree requirement, graduate economics programs often include "quantitative techniques", which covers (applied) linear algebra, multivariate calculus, and optimization, and may include dynamical systems and analysis; regardless, econometrics is usually a separate course, and is dealt with in depth. Similarly, Master of Financial Economics (and MSc Finance) programs often include a (supplementary) course covering the calculus, optimization, linear algebra, and probability techniques required for specific topics.

== See also ==
- Operations research
- Management science
- Econometrics

== Bibliography ==
- Anthony, M. & Biggs, N. (1996). Mathematics for Economics and Finance: Methods And Modelling, Cambridge University Press. ISBN 9780521559133
- Bradley, Teresa (2013). Essential Mathematics for Economics and Business 4th Edition, Wiley. ISBN 978-1118358290
- Brechner, Robert. (2006). Contemporary Mathematics for Business and Consumers, Thomson South-Western. ISBN 0-324-30455-2
- Dowling, Edward (2009). Schaum's Outline of Mathematical Methods for Business and Economics, McGraw-Hill. ISBN 0071635327
- Rosser, M. & Lis, P. (2016). Basic Mathematics for Economists 3rd Edition. Routledge. ISBN 9780415485920
- Wegner, Trevor. (2016). Applied Business Statistics: Methods and Excel-Based Applications, Juta Academic. ISBN 9781485111931
