= Single-equation methods (econometrics) =

A variety of methods are used in econometrics to estimate models consisting of a single equation. The oldest and still the most commonly used is the ordinary least squares method used to estimate linear regressions.

A variety of methods are available to estimate non-linear models. A particularly important class of non-linear models are those used to estimate relationships where the dependent variable is discrete, truncated or censored. These include logit, probit and Tobit models.

Single equation methods may be applied to time-series, cross section or panel data.
