= Civilekonom =

Professional title used by business graduates in Sweden

Civilekonom, literally "civil economist", is a professional title in Sweden (with corresponding titles in Denmark and Norway, see below) which traditionally refers to an individual who holds either a Bachelor's degree or a Master's degree in business administration and economics (with a major in business administration and a minor in economics, or vice versa). Unlike the English language usage, in Swedish, ekonomi ("economy") is commonly used as an umbrella designation for both business- and economics-related subjects.

As an academic title it was first introduced by the Stockholm School of Economics for the degree that the school offered, and was created in parallel to the already established engineering degree civilingenjör.

Formally, the exam certificate for a civilekonom would say ekonomexamen ("degree in economy"), or be a general Bachelor's (kandidat) or Master's (magister) degree.

Although the title remains unprotected in Sweden and the aforementioned practice is still in use, as of 2007 a new academic degree called Civilekonomexamen (Master of Science in Business and Economics) has been introduced which can be awarded after four years of studies in business administration and economics by the following universities in Sweden:

- University of Gothenburg (Gothenburg)
- Linköping University (Linköping)
- Luleå University of Technology (Luleå)
- Lund University (Lund)
- Umeå University (Umeå)
- Linnaeus University (Växjö and Kalmar)
- Örebro University (Örebro)
- Jönköping University (Jönköping)
- Halmstad University (Halmstad)
- Karlstad University (Karlstad)

== See also ==
- Civiløkonom for the corresponding Danish title
- Siviløkonom for the corresponding Norwegian title
- Socionom
