= Civiløkonom =

Professional title in Denmark

Civiløkonom, literally "civil economist", is a professional title in Denmark (with corresponding titles in Norway and Sweden, see below under "See also") used for an individual who holds a certain degree in business administration and economics after three years of studies: Erhvervsvidenskabelig Afgangseksamen (in Danish) candidatus mercaturae (in Latin). The candidatus mercaturae (cand.merc. for short) is a 2-year MSc programme on top of the BSc Handelsvidenskabelig Afgangseksamen (HA for short), so a person holding a cand.merc title has studied at a university for at least 5 years (3 years as an undergraduate/college student, and 2 years in graduate school). Both the undergraduate and the graduate programs are offered as combination programs including other scientific fields, such as computer science, psychology, math, philosophy etc.

== See also ==
- Civilekonom for the corresponding Swedish title
- Siviløkonom for the corresponding Norwegian title
