= Ole Danbolt Mjøs =

Norwegian physician and politician

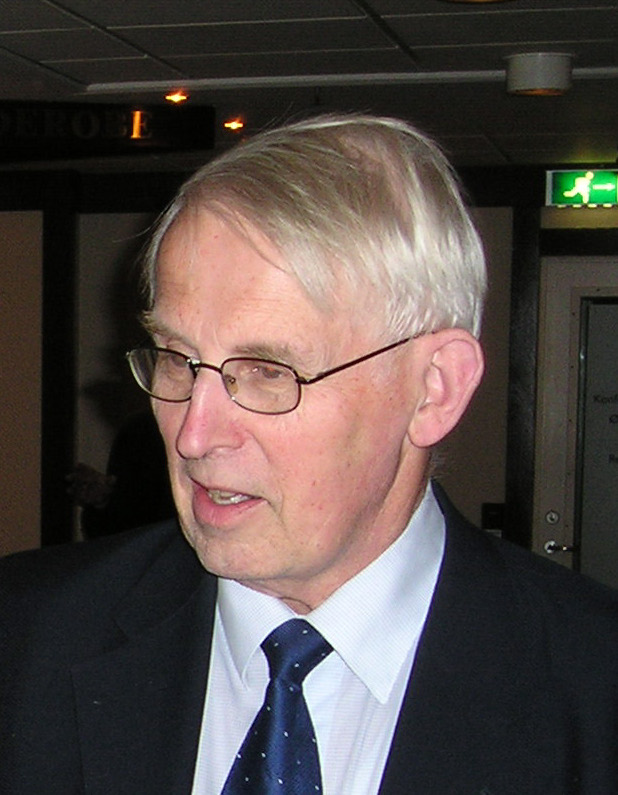
- Mjøs in 2004
- Born: 8 March 1939; Bergen, Norway
- Died: 1 October 2013 (aged 74)
- Known for: Leader, Mjøs Committee (1998–2000); Leader, Nobel Committee (2003–2008)
- Awards: Order of St. Olav; Order of the Lion
- Scientific career
- Fields: Medicine; Physiology
- Institutions: University of Tromsø

Ole Danbolt Mjøs (8 March 1939 – 1 October 2013) was a Norwegian physician and politician for the Christian Democratic Party. A professor and former rector at the University of Tromsø, he was known worldwide as the leader of the Norwegian Nobel Committee from 2003 to 2008.

== Career ==
Born in Bergen, he took the dr.med. degree in 1972. In 1975 he was appointed professor of physiology at the University of Tromsø. From 1989 to 1995 he served as rector there.

Mjøs was also well known outside of his academic field. He chaired Kringkastingsrådet from 1990 to 1994, and has held various political offices. From 1998 to 2000 he chaired the so-called Mjøs Committee, which delivered the Norwegian Official Report 2000:14, thus paving way for the so-called Quality Reform.

From 2003 to 2008 he chaired the Norwegian Nobel Committee, which is awarding the Nobel Peace Prize. Laureates during his times as chair were Shirin Ebadi (2003), Wangari Maathai (2004) the International Atomic Energy Agency and Mohamed ElBaradei (2005) Muhammad Yunus and the Grameen Bank (2006), Al Gore and the Intergovernmental Panel on Climate Change (2007), and Martti Ahtisaari (2008). In 2009, he was succeeded as leader by Thorbjørn Jagland.

Mjøs was decorated with the Royal Norwegian Order of St. Olav and the Order of the Lion of Finland.

Mjøs died following a long illness on 1 October 2013, aged 74.

Academic offices
Preceded by Narve Bjørgo	Rector of the University of Tromsø; 1989–1995	Succeeded by Tove Bull
Other offices
Preceded by Gunnar Berge	Chair of the Norwegian Nobel Committee; 2003–2008	Succeeded by Thorbjørn Jagland
