= European Master in Law and Economics =

Postgraduate master's degree

The European Master in Law and Economics (EMLE) is an Erasmus Mundus postgraduate master's degree. It focuses on "interdisciplinary studies of law and economics" and "an advanced understanding of the economic effects of divergent laws."

It is offered by a consortium of ten universities: Erasmus University Rotterdam (co-ordinating institution), University of Hamburg, Pompeu Fabra University (Barcelona), Ghent University, Aix-Marseille University, LUMSA University (Rome), University of Vienna, University of Haifa, Warsaw School of Economics, and the Indira Gandhi Institute of Development Research (Mumbai).

Students who participate in the European Master in Law and Economics Program usually divide their time between two or three of the participating Universities and, depending on their allocations, can receive multiple-degrees from each institution where they have undertaken studies. The partner universities variously award Master of Laws, Master of Science, or Master of Arts degrees. The language of instruction is English, but the master thesis can also be written in another European language.

== History ==
The European Master Programme in Law and Economics started in 1990 at the University of Oxford, University of Ghent, Paris Dauphine University, and Erasmus University Rotterdam with 20 students from a variety of countries. From the very beginning, the Programme received recognition and financial support of the ERASMUS Bureau of the European Community. The partner universities exchanged multilateral agreements to continue their joint venture and made all the necessary arrangements in order to be included in the new SOCRATES framework between the European Commission and the European universities. The number of partner universities has increased rapidly and the network now comprises seven teaching centres within the EU and two internationally.

== Structure ==
The European Master Programme in Law and Economics is the primary source of high quality postgraduate education in the field of the economic analysis of law. The European Master in Law and Economics is designed to provide students with advanced knowledge in the Economic Analysis of Law and to allow them to use economic methods to explain and assess the effects of divergent legal rules. Students study introductory courses and core courses on the major topics in the economic analysis of law.

Students also take specialized courses and write a master thesis. The European Master in Law and Economics includes three kinds of courses: Economic Courses, Comparative Law Courses, and Law and Economics Courses.

Students will become competent to work for private companies, public organizations, as economic advisers, or for large multinational law firms. Graduates are also well prepared for research in Law and Economics. Many European Master in Law and Economics graduates now hold teaching positions in European universities.
