= Siviløkonom =

Professional title used by business graduates in Norway

Siviløkonom (transl. civil economist) is an academic degree issued within the field of business administration. It consists of a 3 year bachelor's degree followed by a two years masters degree and is also a professional title in Norway (with corresponding titles in Denmark and Sweden, see below under "See also"), obtained after the total of 5 years of studies. The title is protected and can only be used by persons having met certain qualifications as directed by the Norwegian Ministry of Education and Research. It is mainly offered by nine institutions after the completion of a Master of Science in Business Administration.

Master of Science in Business Administration programs entitling the Siviløkonom in Norway are:

- Oslo and Akershus University College of Applied Sciences (HiOA) (Oslo)
- Bodø Graduate School of Business (UiN) (Bodø)
- Norwegian School of Economics (NHH) (Bergen)
- BI Norwegian Business School (BI) (Oslo)
- Norwegian University of Life Sciences (Ås)
- Buskerud University College (Hønefoss)
- Molde University College (Molde)
- Trondheim Business School (HiST) (Trondheim)
- University of Agder (Kristiansand)
- University of Stavanger (Stavanger)
- University of Tromsø (Tromsø)
- Norwegian University of Science and Technology (Ålesund)

Additionally, the title can be granted to candidates with foreign education meeting certain criteria, through application to the NHH. Due to changes in the Norwegian educational system, granting of the title based on foreign education was phased out on 12/31/2008, and could through that date only be granted to persons who started their qualifying education prior to 1/1/2003.

== History ==
Traditionally the siviløkonom degree was only offered at NHH in Bergen, and was originally a two-year, then three-year program. In 1975 it became a four-year business administration degree at the level equivalent to a cand.mag. degree. NHH had a monopoly on awarding the degree until 1985 when the Norwegian School of Management BI and the Bodø Graduate School of Business was allowed to offer the degree. After the quality reform all institutions of higher education were allowed to issue the title to all master graduates, and the requirements for the degree increased from four to five years of study.

== See also ==
- Civilekonom for the corresponding Swedish title
- Civiløkonom for the corresponding Danish title
