= Council for Economic Education =

National Council on Economic Education

- Abbreviation: CEE
- Type: Non-profit organization
- Purpose: Promotion of economic literacy
- Headquarters: New York, NY, USA
- President/CEO: Steve Bumbaugh
- Board Chair: Rebecca Patterson
- Secretary: Willard Hill, Jr.
- Treasurer: Holly Hess Groos

The Council for Economic Education (formerly the National Council on Economic Education until January 2009) is an organization in the United States that focuses on the economic and financial education of students from kindergarten through high school.

The mission of the Council for Economic Education is to instill in young people "the fourth 'R'"—a real-world understanding of economics and personal finance. This is based upon the principle that only by acquiring economic and financial literacy can children learn how to become financially stable and identify beneficial opportunities, ultimately allowing them to grow into successful and productive adults capable of making informed and responsible decisions.

Headquartered in New York City, CEE provides classroom resources to K-12 teachers and students, free professional development to educators, webinars, standards and assessment tools, and guidance for advocacy and outreach.

== Campaign for Economic Literacy ==
The Council for Economic Education is working on a campaign to increase economic literacy.

=== Classroom Reach ===
It was reported in 2013 that five million K-12 students annually used the Council for Economic Education's personal-finance and economics education.

=== Council for Economic Education’s (CEE) Survey of the States ===
The Council for Economic Education measures through a biennial survey financial literacy education across the United States by state.

=== National Content Standards in Personal Finance ===
The Council for Economic Education released its National Content Standards in Personal Finance in March 2013 that are a personal finance course for high.

=== Annual Financial Literacy and Economic Education Conference ===
The Annual Conference is a nationwide meeting of K–12 educators, CEE affiliates from across the country, Federal Reserve partners, and other educators in this field. The conference features a selection of professional development workshops on economic and financial literacy geared for elementary, middle and high school levels. Topics include pedagogy and resources, curriculum strategy for schools/school districts, teaching strategies, assessment and research, new programs and best practices. In addition to the workshops, speakers address current economic and financial topics to enable educators to bring these perspectives back to their classrooms. The conference also features roundtable sessions led by master teachers to discuss shared issues and successes, and informal opportunities for networking.

== National Personal Finance Challenge ==
The National Personal Finance Challenge (NPFC) is a high school and middle school Personal Finance competition. Each year, over 18,000 students across the U.S. participate in the competition. The Challenge aims to motivate students to build, apply and showcase their knowledge of finance. It also enables teachers to give students tools to create financial stability and economic opportunity.

Students across the country compete on the state level, with state winners advancing to the National Finals. Teams of four students answer rigorous questions on Personal Finance and current events. At the National Final level, students are given a detailed fictitious family scenario and two hours to prepare a financial plan for the family. They then present their plan to a panel of expert judges. Teams are judged on content knowledge, team work, and presentation skills, in order to earn the title of National Personal Finance Challenge Champions.

Year	Winner
2023	Adrian C. Wilcox High School (Santa Clara, California)
2022	Land O' Lakes High School (Land O' Lakes, FL)
2021	Millard North High School (Omaha, NE)
2020	Adrian C. Wilcox High School (Santa Clara, CA)
2019	Salanter Akiba Riverdale High School (Bronx, NY)

== National Economics Challenge ==
The National Economics Challenge (NEC) is a high school economics competition. Each year, over 11,000 students across the U.S. participate in the competition. The Challenge recognizes exceptional high school students for their knowledge of economic principles and their ability to apply problem-solving and critical-thinking skills to real-world events.

The National Economics Challenge is the only national competition of its kind, with students showcasing their knowledge of economics in a fun, challenging, and rewarding contest. The competition begins at the state level, with state champions advancing to the National Semi-Final round and the top performers subsequently advancing to the National Final round, which is held in New York City. Teams of four students answer rigorous questions on microeconomics, macroeconomics, international economics, and current events. At the National Final level, students complete rounds of multiple choice testing, work in teams to solve critical thinking case problems, and participate in a quick-paced oral quiz bowl in order to earn the title of National Economics Challenge Champions.

The National Economics Challenge offers a two-division contest format based on students’ economics coursework. The Adam Smith division is designed for students who are enrolled in Advanced Placement, international baccalaureate and honors economics courses. The David Ricardo division is fashioned for students who have received a general economics education, typically of one semester or less. The two-division system provides high school students of varying levels of economics practice with the chance to compete against their peers.

The Council for Economic Education sponsors the National Economics Challenge.

== Sponsors ==
The following is a partial list of donors to the Campaign for Economic Literacy. Each has donated at least 100,000 US Dollars to the Campaign.

3M Foundation	Allstate Insurance Company	American Express Foundation
Ameritech	AT&T	Bank of America Charitable Foundation
Business Roundtable	Carson Group	Thomas J. Holce Investments
HSBC – North America	International Paper	Ewing Marion Kauffman Foundation
The Calvin K. Kazanjian Economics Foundation	The McGraw-Hill Companies	Merrill Lynch
The Moody's Foundation	Mortgage Bankers Association	NASDAQ Educational Foundation
State Farm Insurance Companies	The John Templeton Foundation	United States Department of Education
UPS Foundation, Inc.	The Vanguard Group	Verizon Foundation
Wells Fargo	Worth Media	

Other past contributors:

- Ariel Investments, LLC
- Caterpillar Foundation
- Charles Schwab Foundation
- Citigroup Foundation
- Dillon Foundation, Inc.
- Edward Jones
- FedEx Services
- Ford Motor Company Fund
- JA Japan
- JP Morgan Chase & Co.
- Kraft Foods, Inc.
- McDonald's USA
- Mentor Press LLC
- NYSE Group
- Univision Radio
