= Kinlay =

Kinlay is a surname. Notable people with the surname include:

- Antonia Kinlay, British-American actress and voiceover artist
- James Kinlay (1926–2010), Scottish journalist and assistant editor of the Sunday Express
- Jonathan Kinlay, British quantitative researcher and hedge fund manager

== See also ==
- Kinlay Group, British business
