= Financial modeling =

Modeling financial systems

Financial modeling is the task of building an abstract representation (a model) of a real world financial situation. This is a mathematical model designed to represent (a simplified version of) the performance of a financial asset or portfolio of a business, project, or any other investment.

Typically, then, financial modeling is understood to mean an exercise in either asset pricing or corporate finance of a quantitative nature. It involves translating a set of hypotheses about the behavior of markets or agents into numerical predictions. At the same time, "financial modeling" is a general term that means different things to different users; the reference usually relates either to accounting and corporate finance applications or to quantitative finance applications.

== Accounting ==
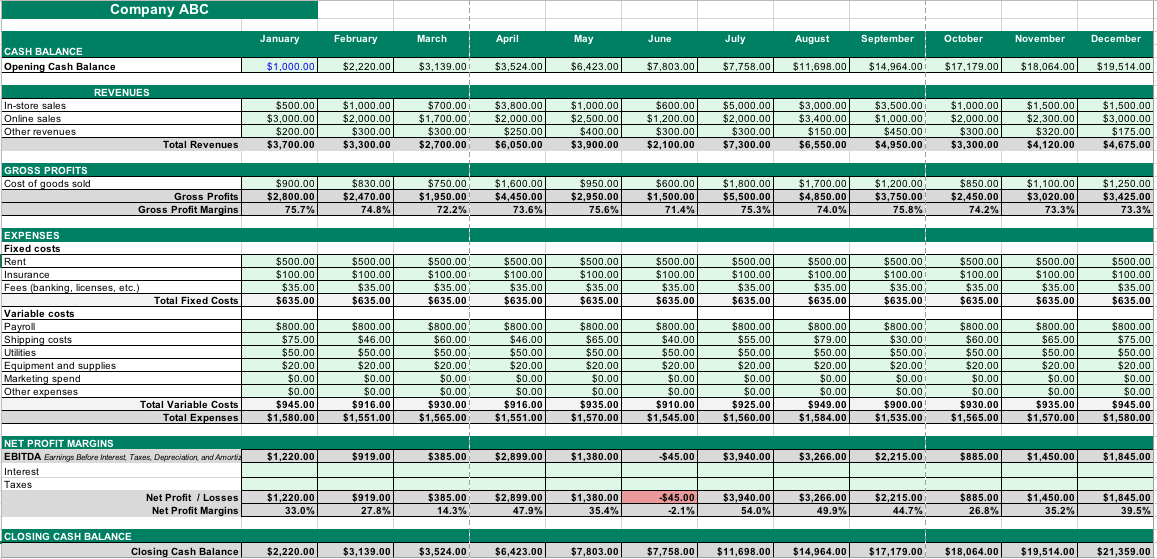
Spreadsheet-based Cash Flow Projection (click to view at full size)

In corporate finance and the accounting profession, financial modeling typically entails financial statement forecasting; usually the preparation of detailed company-specific models used for decision making purposes, valuation and financial analysis. In entrepreneurial and investment contexts, financial models are widely used to illustrate business viability and capital requirements for funding discussions.

Applications include:

- Business valuation, stock valuation, and project valuation - especially via discounted cash flow, but including other valuation approaches
- Scenario planning, FP&A and management decision making ("what is"; "what if"; "what has to be done")
- Budgeting: revenue forecasting and analytics; production budgeting; operations budgeting
- Capital budgeting, including cost of capital (i.e. WACC) calculations
- Cash flow forecasting; working capital- and treasury management; asset and liability management
- Financial statement analysis / ratio analysis (including of operating- and finance leases, and R&D)
- Transaction analytics: M&A, PE, VC, LBO, IPO, Project finance, P3
- Credit decisioning: Credit analysis, impairment- and provision-modeling
- Management accounting: Activity-based costing, Profitability analysis, Cost analysis, Whole-life cost, Managerial risk accounting
- Public sector procurement

To generalize as to the nature of these models: firstly, as they are built around financial statements, calculations and outputs are monthly, quarterly or annual; secondly, the inputs take the form of "assumptions", where the analyst specifies the values that will apply in each period for external / global variables (exchange rates, tax percentage, etc....; may be thought of as the model parameters), and for internal / company specific variables (wages, unit costs, etc....). Correspondingly, both characteristics are reflected (at least implicitly) in the mathematical form of these models: firstly, the models are in discrete time; secondly, they are deterministic. For discussion of the issues that may arise, see below; for discussion as to more sophisticated approaches sometimes employed, see Corporate finance § Quantifying uncertainty and Financial economics § Corporate finance theory.

Modelers are often designated "financial analyst" (and are sometimes referred to, tongue in cheek, as "number crunchers"). Typically, the modeler will have completed an MBA or MSF with (optional) coursework in "financial modeling". Accounting qualifications and finance certifications such as the CIIA and CFA generally do not provide direct or explicit training in modeling. At the same time, numerous commercial training courses are offered, both through universities and privately. For the components and steps of business modeling here, see Outline of finance § Financial modeling; see also Valuation using discounted cash flows § Determine cash flow for each forecast period for further discussion and considerations.

Although purpose-built business software does exist, the vast proportion of the market is spreadsheet-based; this is largely since the models are almost always company-specific. Also, analysts will each have their own criteria and methods for financial modeling. Microsoft Excel now has by far the dominant position, having overtaken Lotus 1-2-3 in the 1990s. Spreadsheet-based modelling can have its own problems, and several standardizations and "best practice"s have been proposed. Here, professional guidelines emphasize transparent, auditable, and well-documented models. Good practice includes separating input, calculation, and output sheets to enhance traceability and reduce error risk. Practical training providers further highlight consistent formatting, clear labeling, and documentation of assumptions as essential for usability and stakeholder confidence. "Spreadsheet risk" is increasingly studied and managed; see model audit.

One critique here, is that model outputs, i.e. line items, often inhere "unrealistic implicit assumptions" and "internal inconsistencies". (For example, a forecast for growth in revenue but without corresponding increases in working capital, fixed assets and the associated financing, may imbed unrealistic assumptions about asset turnover, debt level and/or equity financing. See Sustainable growth rate § From a financial perspective.) What is required, but often lacking, is that all key elements are explicitly and consistently forecasted. Related to this, is that modellers often additionally "fail to identify crucial assumptions" relating to inputs, "and to explore what can go wrong". Here, in general, modellers "use point values and simple arithmetic instead of probability distributions and statistical measures" — i.e., as mentioned, the problems are treated as deterministic in nature — and thus calculate a single value for the asset or project, but without providing information on the range, variance and sensitivity of outcomes; see Valuation using discounted cash flows § Determine equity value. A further, more general critique relates to the lack of basic computer programming concepts amongst modelers, with the result that their models are often poorly structured, and difficult to maintain. Serious criticism is also directed at the nature of budgeting, and its impact on the organization.

== Quantitative finance ==
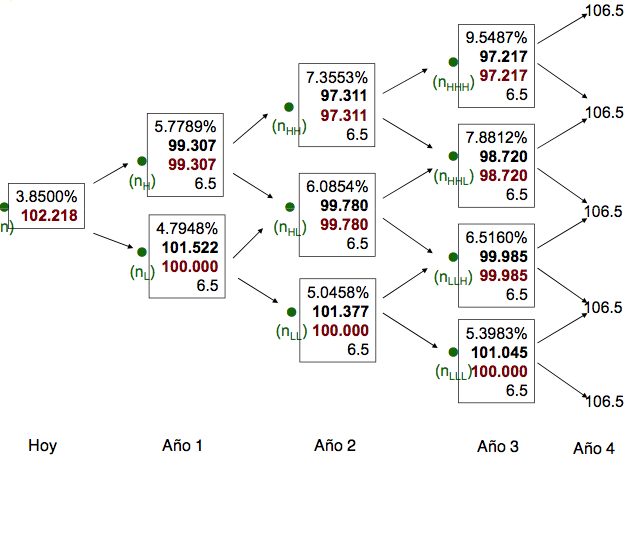
Visualization of an interest rate "tree" - usually returned by commercial derivatives software

In quantitative finance, financial modeling entails the development of a sophisticated mathematical model. Models here deal with asset prices, market movements, portfolio returns and the like. Relatedly, applications include:

- Option pricing and calculation of their "Greeks" (accommodating volatility surfaces - via local / stochastic volatility models - and multi-curves)
- Other derivatives, especially interest rate derivatives, credit derivatives and exotic derivatives
- Credit valuation adjustment, CVA, as well as the various XVA
- Modeling the term structure of interest rates (bootstrapping / multi-curves, short-rate models, HJM framework) and any related credit spread
- Credit risk, Consumer credit risk, counterparty credit risk and regulatory capital: EAD, PD, LGD, PFE, EE; Jarrow–Turnbull model, Merton model, KMV model
- Portfolio optimization and Quantitative investing more generally; see further re optimization methods employed.
- Credit scoring and provisioning; Credit scorecards and IFRS 9 § Impairment
- Structured product design and manufacture
- Financial risk modeling: value at risk (parametric- and / or historical, CVaR, EVT), stress testing, "sensitivities" analysis (Greeks, duration, convexity, DV01, KRD, CS01, JTD)
- Corporate finance applications: cash flow analytics, corporate financing activity prediction problems, and risk analysis in capital investment
- Real options
- Actuarial applications: Dynamic financial analysis (DFA), UIBFM, investment modeling

These problems are generally stochastic and continuous in nature, and models here thus require complex algorithms, entailing computer simulation, advanced numerical methods (such as numerical differential equations, numerical linear algebra, dynamic programming) and/or the development of optimization models. The general nature of these problems is discussed under Mathematical finance § History: Q versus P, while specific techniques are listed under Outline of finance § Mathematical tools. For further discussion here see also: Brownian model of financial markets; Martingale pricing; Financial models with long-tailed distributions and volatility clustering; Extreme value theory; Historical simulation (finance).

Modellers are generally referred to as "quants", i.e. quantitative analysts (or "rocket scientists") and typically have advanced (Ph.D. level) backgrounds in quantitative disciplines such as statistics, physics, engineering, computer science, mathematics or operations research. Alternatively, or in addition to their quantitative background, they complete a finance masters with a quantitative orientation, such as the Master of Quantitative Finance, or the more specialized Master of Computational Finance or Master of Financial Engineering; the CQF certificate is increasingly common.

Although spreadsheets are widely used here also (almost always requiring extensive VBA); custom C++, Fortran or Python, or numerical-analysis software such as MATLAB, are often preferred, particularly where stability or speed is a concern. MATLAB is often used at the research or prototyping stage because of its intuitive programming, graphical and debugging tools, but C++/Fortran are preferred for conceptually simple but high computational-cost applications where MATLAB is too slow; Python is increasingly used due to its simplicity, and large standard library / available applications, including, for example, QuantLib. Additionally, for many (of the standard) derivative and portfolio applications, commercial software is available, and the choice as to whether the model is to be developed in-house, or whether existing products are to be deployed, will depend on the problem in question. See Quantitative analysis (finance) § Library quantitative analysis.

The complexity of these models may result in incorrect pricing or hedging or both. This Model risk is the subject of ongoing research by finance academics, and is a topic of great, and growing, interest in the risk management arena.

Criticism of the discipline (often preceding the 2008 financial crisis by several years) emphasizes the differences between finance and the mathematical / physical sciences, and stresses the resultant caution to be applied by modelers, and by traders and risk managers using their models. Notable here are Emanuel Derman and Paul Wilmott, authors of the Financial Modelers' Manifesto. Some go further and question whether the mathematical- and statistical modeling techniques usually applied to finance are appropriate (see the assumptions made for options and for portfolios). In fact, these may go so far as to question the "empirical and scientific validity... of modern financial theory". Notable here are Nassim Taleb and Benoit Mandelbrot. See also Mathematical finance § Criticism, Financial economics § Challenges and criticism and Financial engineering § Criticisms.

== Competitive modeling ==
Several financial modeling competitions exist, emphasizing speed and accuracy in modeling. The Microsoft-sponsored ModelOff Financial Modeling World Championships were held annually from 2012 to 2019, with competitions throughout the year and a finals championship in New York or London. After its end in 2020, several other modeling championships have been started, including the Financial Modeling World Cup and Microsoft Excel Collegiate Challenge, also sponsored by Microsoft.

== Philosophy of financial modeling ==
Philosophy of financial modeling is a branch of philosophy concerned with the foundations, methods, and implications of modeling science.

In the philosophy of financial modeling, scholars have more recently begun to question the generally held assumption that financial modelers seek to represent any "real-world" or actually ongoing investment situation. Instead, it has been suggested that the task of the financial modeler resides in demonstrating the possibility of a transaction in a prospective investment scenario, based on a limited set of possibility conditions initially assumed in the model.

== See also ==
- All models are wrong
- Asset pricing model
- Economic model
- Financial engineering
- Financial forecast
- Financial Modelers' Manifesto
- Financial models with long-tailed distributions and volatility clustering
- Financial planning
- Integrated business planning
- Model audit
- Modeling and analysis of financial markets
- Outline of finance § Education
- Pro forma § Financial statements
- Profit model
- Return on modeling effort
- Unreasonable ineffectiveness of mathematics § Economics and finance

== Bibliography ==
General

- Avon, Jack (2017). The Financial Modellers VBA Compendium. London: Begawans Veranda. ISBN 978-0-9956-7254-3.
- Benninga, Simon (1997). Financial Modeling. Cambridge, MA: MIT Press. ISBN 0-585-13223-2.
- Benninga, Simon (2006). Principles of Finance with Excel. New York: Oxford University Press. ISBN 0-19-530150-1.
- Fabozzi, Frank J. (2012). Encyclopedia of Financial Models. Hoboken, NJ: Wiley. ISBN 978-1-118-00673-3.
- Ho, Thomas; Sang Bin Lee (2004). The Oxford Guide to Financial Modeling. New York: Oxford University Press. ISBN 978-0-19-516962-1.
- Sengupta, Chandan (2009). Financial Analysis and Modeling Using Excel and VBA, 2nd Edition. Hoboken, NJ: John Wiley & Sons. ISBN 9780470275603.
- Winston, Wayne (2014). Microsoft Excel 2013 Data Analysis and Business Modeling. Microsoft Press. ISBN 978-0735669130.
- Yip, Henry (2005). Spreadsheet Applications to securities valuation and investment theories. John Wiley and Sons Australia Ltd. ISBN 0470807962.

Corporate finance

- Avon, Jack. (2021). The Handbook of Financial Modeling (2nd ed.). New York: Springer. doi:10.1007/978-1-4842-6540-6. ISBN 978-1-4842-6540-6. S2CID 227164870.
- Bastick, Liam (2020). Introduction to Financial Modeling. Wiley. ISBN 978-1615470662.
- Beech, G. and Thayser, D. (2015). Valuations, Mergers and Acquisitions. Oxford: Oxford University Press. ISBN 978-0-585-13223-5.
- Day, Alastair (2007). Mastering Financial Modelling in Microsoft Excel. London: Pearson Education. ISBN 978-0-273-70806-3.
- Fairhurst, Danielle (2022). Financial Modeling in Excel for Dummies. John Wiley & Sons. p. 120. ISBN 978-1-119-84451-8. OCLC 1264716849.
- Lynch, Penelope (1997). Financial Modelling for Project Finance, 2nd Edition. Euromoney Trading. ISBN 9781843745488.
- Mayes, Timothy R.; Shank, Todd M. (2014). Financial Analysis with Microsoft Excel (7th ed.). Boston: Cengage Learning. ISBN 978-1-285-43227-4.
- Peter K Nevitt; Frank J. Fabozzi (2000). Project Financing. Euromoney Institutional Investor PLC. ISBN 978-1-85564-791-6.
- Ongkrutaraksa, Worapot (2006). Financial Modeling and Analysis: A Spreadsheet Technique for Financial, Investment, and Risk Management, 2nd Edition. Frenchs Forest: Pearson Education Australia. ISBN 0-7339-8474-6.
- Palepu, Krishna G.; Paul M. Healy (2012). Business Analysis and Valuation Using Financial Statements, 5th Edition. Boston: South-Western College Publishing. ISBN 978-1111972288.
- Pignataro, Paul (2003). Financial Modeling and Valuation: A Practical Guide to Investment Banking and Private Equity. Hoboken, NJ: Wiley. ISBN 978-1118558768.
- Proctor, Scott (2009). Building Financial Models with Microsoft Excel: A Guide for Business Professionals, 2nd Edition. Hoboken, NJ: Wiley. ISBN 978-0-470-48174-5.
- Rees, Michael (2008). Financial Modelling in Practice: A Concise Guide for Intermediate and Advanced Level. Hoboken, NJ: Wiley. ISBN 978-0-470-99744-4.
- Rees, Michael (2023). The Essentials of Financial Modeling in Excel: A Concise Guide to Concepts and Methods. Hoboken, NJ: Wiley. ISBN 978-1394157785.
- Soubeiga, Eric (2013). Mastering Financial Modeling: A Professional's Guide to Building Financial Models in Excel. New York: McGraw-Hill. ISBN 978-0071808507.
- Swan, Jonathan (2007). Financial Modelling Special Report. London: Institute of Chartered Accountants in England & Wales.
- Swan, Jonathan (2008). Practical Financial Modelling, 2nd Edition. London: CIMA Publishing. ISBN 978-0-7506-8647-1.
- Tham, Joseph; Ignacio Velez-Pareja (2004). Principles of Cash Flow Valuation: An Integrated Market-Based Approach. Amsterdam: Elsevier. ISBN 0-12-686040-8.
- Tjia, John (2003). Building Financial Models. New York: McGraw-Hill. ISBN 0-07-140210-1.

Quantitative finance

- Hirsa, Ali (2013). Computational Methods in Finance. Boca Raton: CRC Press. ISBN 9781439829578.
- Blatter, Anja; Bradbury, Sean; Bruhn, Pascal; Ernst, Dietmar (2025). Risk Management in Banks and Insurance Companies. Springer. ISBN 978-3-031-42835-7.
- Brooks, Robert (2000). Building Financial Derivatives Applications with C++. Westport: Praeger. ISBN 978-1567202878.
- Brigo, Damiano; Fabio Mercurio (2006). Interest Rate Models - Theory and Practice with Smile, Inflation and Credit (2nd ed.). London: Springer Finance. ISBN 978-3-540-22149-4.
- Clewlow, Les; Chris Strickland (1998). Implementing Derivative Models. New Jersey: Wiley. ISBN 0-471-96651-7.
- Duffy, Daniel (2004). Financial Instrument Pricing Using C++. New Jersey: Wiley. ISBN 978-0470855096.
- Fabozzi, Frank J. (1998). Valuation of fixed income securities and derivatives, 3rd Edition. Hoboken, NJ: Wiley. ISBN 978-1-883249-25-0.
- Fabozzi, Frank J.; Sergio M. Focardi; Petter N. Kolm (2004). Financial Modeling of the Equity Market: From CAPM to Cointegration. Hoboken, NJ: Wiley. ISBN 0-471-69900-4.
- Shayne Fletcher; Christopher Gardner (2010). Financial Modelling in Python. John Wiley and Sons. ISBN 978-0-470-74789-6.
- Fusai, Gianluca; Andrea Roncoroni (2008). Implementing Models in Quantitative Finance: Methods and Cases. London: Springer Finance. ISBN 978-3-540-22348-1.
- Haug, Espen Gaarder (2007). The Complete Guide to Option Pricing Formulas, 2nd edition. McGraw-Hill. ISBN 978-0071389976.
- M. Henrard (2014). Interest Rate Modelling in the Multi-Curve Framework. Springer. ISBN 978-1137374653.
- Hilpisch, Yves (2015). Derivatives Analytics with Python: Data Analysis, Models, Simulation, Calibration and Hedging. New Jersey: Wiley. ISBN 978-1-119-03799-6.
- Jackson, Mary; Mike Staunton (2001). Advanced modelling in finance using Excel and VBA. New Jersey: Wiley. ISBN 0-471-49922-6.
- Jondeau, Eric; Ser-Huang Poon; Michael Rockinger (2007). Financial Modeling Under Non-Gaussian Distributions. London: Springer. ISBN 978-1849965996.
- Joerg Kienitz; Daniel Wetterau (2012). Financial Modelling: Theory, Implementation and Practice with MATLAB Source. Hoboken, NJ: Wiley. ISBN 978-0470744895.
- Kwok, Yue-Kuen (2008). Mathematical Models of Financial Derivatives, 2nd edition. London: Springer Finance. ISBN 978-3540422884.
- Levy, George (2004). Computational Finance: Numerical Methods for Pricing Financial Instruments. Butterworth-Heinemann. ISBN 978-0750657228.
- London, Justin (2004). Modeling Derivatives in C++. New Jersey: Wiley. ISBN 978-0471654643.
- Löeffler, G; Posch, P. (2011). Credit Risk Modeling using Excel and VBA. Hoboken, NJ: Wiley. ISBN 978-0470660928.
- Rouah, Fabrice Douglas; Gregory Vainberg (2007). Option Pricing Models and Volatility Using Excel-VBA. New Jersey: Wiley. ISBN 978-0471794646.
- Antoine Savine and Jesper Andreasen (2018). Modern Computational Finance: Scripting for Derivatives and xVA. Wiley. ISBN 978-1119540786.
- Alexander Sokol (2014). Long-Term Portfolio Simulation - For XVA, Limits, Liquidity and Regulatory Capital. Risk Books. ISBN 978-1782720959.
- Charles Tapiero (2004). Risk and Financial Management: Mathematical and Computational Methods. John Wiley & Son. ISBN 0-470-84908-8.
- Humphrey Tung; Donny Lai; Michael Wong; Stephen Ng (2010). Professional Financial Computing Using Excel and VBA. John Wiley & Sons. ISBN 9780470824399.
