= Grant Gillespie (writer) =

English novelist, screenwriter and actor

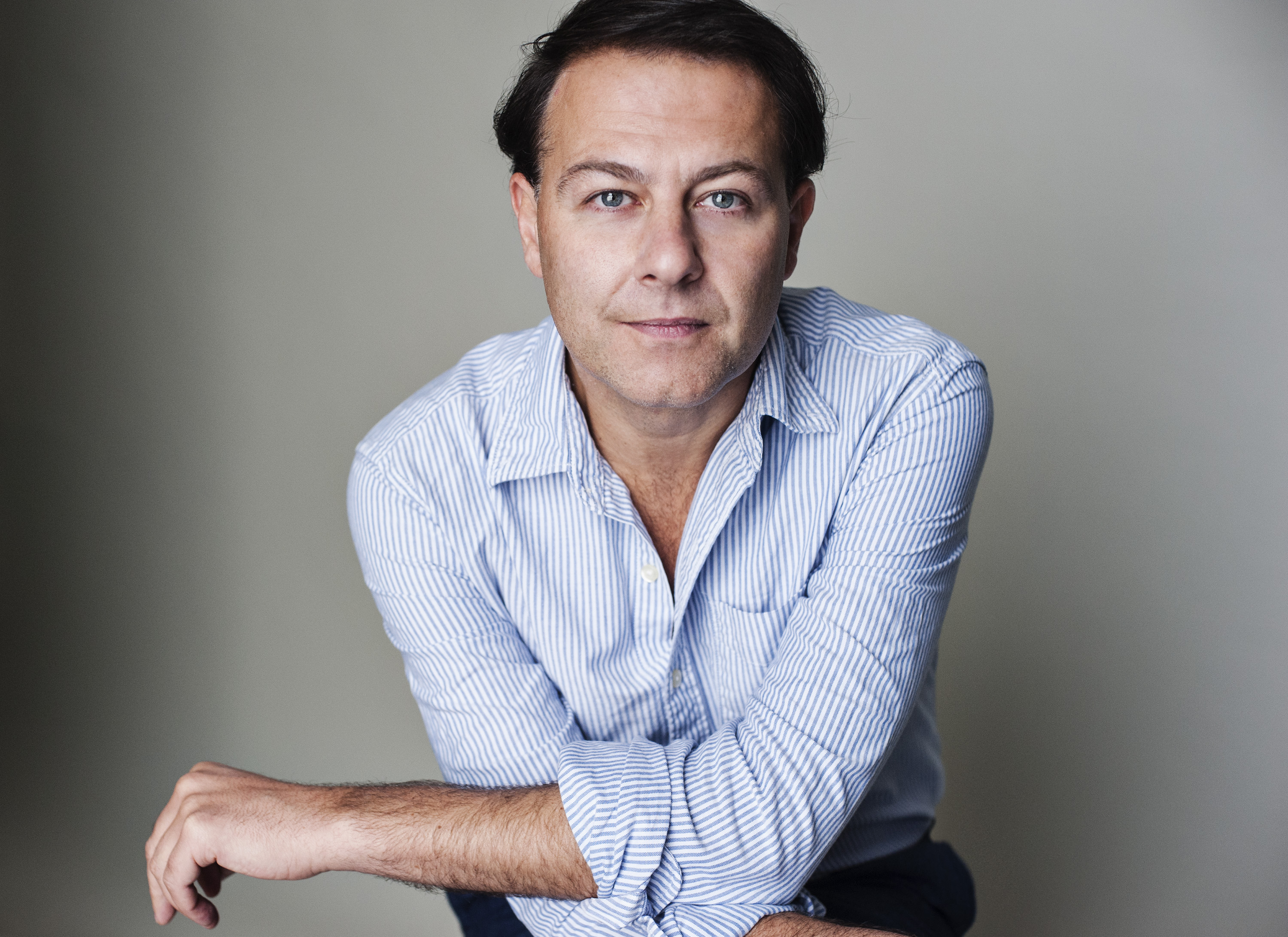
Grant Gillespie

Grant Gillespie is a professional actor, novelist, and screenwriter who lives in London's Bloomsbury.

== Acting career ==
=== Theatre ===
Gillespie has worked extensively in the theatre, including playing Sir Benjamin Backbite in Sheridan's The School for Scandal directed by Jamie Lloyd, Peter in Molière's Don Juan, directed by Michael Grandage, starring Tom Hollander. He's worked with the ETT and director, Stephen Unwin in five shows, including Shakespeare's The Taming of the Shrew and Love's Labour's Lost, and he played Oswald in King Lear to critical acclaim at The Old Vic with Timothy West in the title role. He's also worked with director, Erica Whyman at the Gate Theatre playing the Beggar in Giradoux's adaptation of Electra, and Kit Nubbles in an adaptation of the Dickens novel, The Old Curiosity Shop.

=== Film and television ===
Screen-wise, Gillespie has starred in numerous films, including Living written by Kazuo Ishiguro, directed by Oliver Hermanus, Matthew Vaughn's Kingsman: The Golden Circle and Stephen Frears' Florence Foster Jenkins opposite Hugh Grant. His TV credits include: Catastrophe, The Diplomat, The Crown, Inspector George Gently, Cast Offs, the upcoming C4's series, Pierre and WAR for SKY/HBO.

Other television credits already present on the article include Will (TNT), Siblings, Hollyoaks, Holby City, EastEnders, Doctors, Casualty, Poirot and Midsomer Murders. His other film credits include Lecture 21.

=== Voice and radio ===
Voice-wise, Gillespie has appeared in multiple BBC radio plays, and done MOCAP work at Andy Serkis' The Imaginarium Studios giving life to Sal Drak in Squadron 42. He also voiced the character of Simon the Harrowed in Bloodborne and the protagonist in Dark Souls III.

== Writing ==
As a novelist, Rakkit Productions have just released the audiobook of his novel, The Cuckoo Boy, read by the author, on Audible. The novel was described by The Guardian as 'an emotionally visceral debut,' and The Observer said that 'through James and David, Gillespie explores the chasm between how children and adults perceive the world, and the devastating consequences of falling through this gap. The Cuckoo Boy is a savage indictment of hypocrisy and forced social convention.'

His story, The Upper Hand appears in He Played For His Wife and Other Stories, published by Simon & Schuster sidled in beside Poet Laureate, Carol Ann Duffy, and DBC Pierre. He's currently finishing his next novel, I See You Still, a coming-of-age ghost story set at the end of WW2.

== Film production and screenwriting ==
Gillespie is part of the film production company 100 Names with fellow actors, writers, directors and producers: Laurence Dobiesz, Lisa Kerr, Antonia Kinlay, Olivia Poulet, and Sam Swainsbury. They have made two shorts: a romcom, Deliver Me and the satire, Just Do It, written by Gillespie. Just Do It placed for Best Screenwriter at GenreBlast, Bolton International, FilmFest Bremen, Short.Sweet Festival, YoFi Fest. Poulet, Dobiez, and Gillespie wrote and shot a teaser/trailer for their upcoming feature, One Fell Out, a mockumentary about swingers.

Other screenwriting includes: a pilot for the thriller/drama series, Harvest, the vampire film, Kensington Gore, and the screenplay of his novel, The Cuckoo Boy, which won Bronze in the Let's Make It Screenwriting Contest. All three projects were co-written with actor/writer Kate Ashfield. Gillespie's university drama pilot, The Name of Action, made the semi-finals for Shore Scripts' Pilot Competition, the top 4% of 1000 entries. His thriller pilot, Splinter, was a quarter-finalist in the SWN Awards.

== Biography ==
Gillespie is the child of an Irish mother – a ballet dancer – and a Lebanese father. He was adopted in the 70s by a loving Cheshire couple with good intentions and raised in a small village called Poulton-le-Fylde (which means 'pool town on the field' and is possibly an up-sell).

He attended an ivy-clad private school populated by army and farmy kids who were mostly indulgent to this un-sporty, sensitive misfit. At eighteen, he won a place on a writing course with Helen Dunmore, further igniting his passion for creative writing. He longed to go to drama school, but his parents deemed it an unrealistic phase he'd grow out of. They may have been right, but he's still waiting. They insisted he attended university and read economics or law. So he ran away from home.

He studied English Literature at the University of Glasgow (MA) where he mostly wore three-piece suits and cravats, and shirked lectures to write fiction and perform in plays by genius director/writers, Victoria Beattie and Nicola McCartney. He honed his acting skills at the Citizens Theatre, Tron Theatre, Tramway, Centre for Contemporary Arts, Traverse Theatre, Institute of Contemporary Arts, and in international festivals throughout Europe, Mexico, and Morocco.

An agent at The Richard Stone Partnership offered him representation, but said he may as well linger in Scotland as, unless he was 'gay or played a recherché instrument, actors were ten-a-penny in London'. But, as someone of ambiguous sexuality, who was god-awful at the bassoon, he considered himself half-way there. Plus the siren song of Soho and the West End was too strong to fight...

Acting and writing (plus wine, art, visiting the sea, and other people) are the things that keeps him mostly-sane and the closest he gets to meditation.

== Bibliography ==
- Gillespie, Grant (2010, 2023), The Cuckoo Boy, ISBN 978-1036913151
- Gillespie, Grant (2017), He Played for his Wife and Other Stories, ISBN 978-1471162305
