= Formac =

Formac may refer to:

- FORMAC, the first computer algebra system to have significant use
- Formac Elektronik GmbH, a European-based manufacturer of PC devices
- Formac Lorimer Books, a Canadian publishing company

== See also ==
- Format (disambiguation)
