= Emanuel Derman =

South African economist and physicist

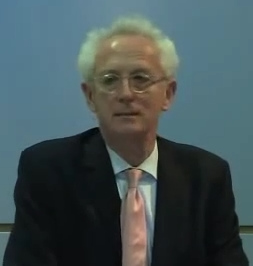
- Derman in July 2013
- Born: 1945 (age 80–81); Cape Town, South Africa
- Citizenship: United States
- Education: Columbia University; University of Cape Town
- Known for: Financial Modelers' Manifesto; Black–Derman–Toy model Local volatility Derman–Kani model
- Awards: 2000 Financial Engineer of the Year
- Scientific career
- Fields: particle physics, financial engineering
- Workplaces: Goldman Sachs; Salomon Brothers; Columbia University
- Doctoral advisor: Norman Christ

Emanuel Derman (born 1945) is a South African-born academic, businessman and writer. He is best known as a quantitative analyst, and author of the book My Life as a Quant: Reflections on Physics and Finance.

He is a co-author of Black–Derman–Toy model, one of the first interest-rate models, and the Derman–Kani local volatility or implied tree model, a model consistent with the volatility smile.

Derman, who first came to the U.S. at age 21, in 1966, is currently a professor at Columbia University and Director of its program in financial engineering. Until recently he was also the Head of Risk and a partner at KKR Prisma Capital Partners, a fund of funds. His book My Life as a Quant: Reflections on Physics and Finance, published by Wiley in September 2004, was one of Business Week's top ten books of the year for 2004. In 2011, he published Models.Behaving.Badly, a book contrasting financial models with the theories of hard science, and also containing some autobiographical material.

== Biography ==
Born to a South African Jewish family, Derman obtained a B.Sc. (Hons) at the University of Cape Town, and received a Ph.D. in theoretical physics from Columbia in 1973, where he wrote a thesis that proposed a test for a weak-neutral current in electron-hadron scattering. This experiment was carried out at SLAC in 1978 by a team led by Charles Prescott and Richard Taylor, and confirmed the Weinberg–Salam model. Between 1973 and 1980 he did research in theoretical particle physics at the University of Pennsylvania, the University of Oxford, Rockefeller University and the University of Colorado at Boulder. From 1980 to 1985 he worked at AT&T Bell Laboratories, where he developed computer languages for business modeling applications.

In 1985 Derman joined Goldman Sachs' fixed income division where he was one of the co-developers of the Black–Derman–Toy interest-rate model.

He left Goldman Sachs at the end of 1988 to take a position at Salomon Brothers Inc. as head of Adjustable Rate Mortgage Research in the Bond Portfolio Analysis group.

Rehired by Goldman Sachs, from 1990 to 2000 he led the Quantitative Strategies group in the Equities division, which pioneered the study of local volatility models and the volatility smile. He was appointed a managing director of Goldman Sachs in 1997. In 2000, he became head of the firm’s Quantitative Risk Strategies group. He retired from Goldman Sachs in 2002 and took a position at Columbia University and Prisma Capital Partners (acquired by KKR).

Derman was named the IAFE/SunGard Financial Engineer of the Year 2000, and was elected to the Risk Hall of Fame in 2002. He is the author of numerous articles on quantitative finance on the topics of volatility and the nature of financial modeling.

Since 1995, Derman has written many articles pointing out the essential difference between models in physics and models in finance. Good models in physics aim to predict the future accurately from the present, or to predict new previously unobserved phenomena; models in finance are used mostly to estimate the values of illiquid securities from liquid ones. Models in physics deal with objective variables; models in finance deal with subjective ones. "In physics there may one day be a Theory of Everything; in finance and the social sciences, you’re lucky if there is a usable theory of anything."

Derman together with Paul Wilmott wrote the Financial Modelers' Manifesto, a set of principles for doing responsible financial modeling.

From February 2011 to July 2012, Derman wrote a financial blog for Reuters. Beginning in September 2012, for one year, Derman wrote a regular column for the Frankfurter Allgemeine Zeitung.

== Models.Behaving.Badly ==
In 2011, Derman published a new book titled Models.Behaving.Badly: Why Confusing Illusion With Reality Can Lead to Disaster, on Wall Street and in Life. In that work he decries the breakdown of capitalism as a model during the bailouts characterizing the 2008 financial crisis and calls for a return to principles, to the notion that if you want to take a chance on the upside, you have also taken a chance on the downside.

More generally, he analyzes three ways of understanding the behavior of the world: models, theory and intuition. Models, he argues, are merely metaphors that compare something you would like to understand with something you already do. Models provide relative knowledge. Theories, in contrast, are attempts to understand the world on absolute terms; while models stand on someone else's legs, theories, like Newton's or Maxwell's or Spinoza's, stand on their own. Intuition, the deepest kind of knowledge, comes only occasionally, after long and hard work, and is a merging of the understander with the understood. His book elaborates on these ideas with examples from the theories of physics and philosophy, and the models of finance.

== The Volatility Smile ==
In 2016, Derman and Michael Miller published a textbook titled The Volatility Smile, a textbook about the principles of financial modeling, option valuation, and the variety of models that can account for the volatility smile.

== Brief Hours and Weeks: My Life as a Capetonian ==
In 2025 Derman published Brief Hours and Weeks, a memoir about youth in the 1940s, 50s, and 60s in a Polish-Jewish off-the-boat immigrant community in Cape Town, South Africa. J. M. Coetzee wrote about it:

"Brief Hours and Weeks awakes many memories of Cape Town, the city of Emanuel Derman's youth and mine, as it was half a century ago. The chapter on the lonely Mrs Gold is a triumph." - J. M. Coetzee, Nobel Laureate.

== See also ==
- All models are wrong
- Financial engineering
- Mathematical finance
- Mathiness
