= Investor =

Person who allocates capital with the expectation of a financial return

An investor is a person or entity that allocates financial capital with the expectation of a future return (profit) or to gain an advantage (interest). Through this allocated capital the investor usually purchases some species of property. Types of investments include equity, debt, securities, real estate, infrastructure, currency, commodity, token, derivatives such as put and call options, futures, forwards, etc. This definition makes no distinction between the investors in the primary and secondary markets. That is, someone who provides a business with capital and someone who buys a stock are both investors. An investor who owns stock is a shareholder.

== Types of investors ==
There are two types of investors: retail investors and institutional investors.

A retail investor is also known as an individual investor.

There are several sub-types of institutional investor:

- Pension plans making investments on behalf of employees
- Businesses that make investments, either directly or via a captive fund
- Endowment funds used by universities, churches, etc.
- Mutual funds, hedge funds, and other funds, ownership of which may or may not be publicly traded (these funds typically pool money raised from their owner-subscribers to invest in securities)
- Sovereign wealth funds
- Large money managers

Investors might also be classified according to their profiles. In this respect, an important distinctive investor psychology trait is risk attitude.

== Investor protection through government ==
Investor protection through government involves regulations and enforcement by government agencies to ensure that market is fair and fraudulent activities are eliminated. An example of a government agency that protects investors is the U.S. Securities and Exchange Commission (SEC), which works to protect reasonable investors in the United States.

Similar protections exist in other countries, including the United Kingdom where individual investors have certain protections via the Financial Services Compensation Scheme (FSCS).

== Investment tax structures ==
Company dividends are paid from net income, which has the tax already deducted. Therefore, shareholders are given some respite with a preferential tax rate of 15% on "qualified dividends" in the event of the company being domiciled in the United States. Alternatively, in another country having a double-taxation treaty with the US, accepted by the Internal Revenue Service (IRS). Non-qualified dividends paid by other foreign companies or entities; for example, those receiving income derived from interest on bonds held by a mutual fund, are taxed at the regular and generally higher rate of income tax. When applied to 2013, this is on a sliding scale up to 39.6%, with an additional 3.8% surtax for high-income taxpayers ($200,000 for singles, $250,000 for married couples).

== Role of the financier ==
A financier (/fɪnənˈsɪər, fə-, -ˈnæn-/) is a person whose primary occupation is either facilitating or directly providing investments to up-and-coming or established companies and businesses, typically involving large sums of money and usually involving private equity and venture capital, mergers and acquisitions, leveraged buyouts, corporate finance, investment banking, or large-scale asset management. A financier makes money through this process when their investment is paid back with interest, from part of the company's equity awarded to them as specified by the business deal, or a financier can generate income through commission, performance, and management fees. A financier can also promote the success of a financed business by allowing the business to take advantage of the financier's reputation. The more experienced and capable the financier is, the more the financier will be able to contribute to the success of the financed entity, and the greater reward the financier will reap. The term, financier, is French, and derives from finance or payment.

Financier is someone who handles money. Certain financier avenues require degrees and licenses including venture capitalists, hedge fund managers, trust fund managers, accountants, stockbrokers, financial advisors, or even public treasurers. Personal investing on the other hand, has no requirements and is open to all using the stock market or by word-of-mouth requests for money. A financier "will be a specialized financial intermediary in the sense that it has experience in liquidating the type of firm it is lending to".

=== Perceptions ===
Economist Edmund Phelps has argued that the financier plays a role in directing capital to investments that governments and social organizations are constrained from playing:

[T]he pluralism of experience that the financiers bring to bear in their decisions gives a wide range of entrepreneurial ideas a chance for insightful evaluation. And, importantly, the financier and the entrepreneur do not need the state's or social partners' approval. Nor are they accountable later on to such social bodies if the project goes badly, not even to the financier's investors. So projects that would be too opaque and uncertain for the state or social partners to endorse can be undertaken.

The concept of the financier has been distinguished from that of a mere capitalist based on the asserted higher level of judgment required of the financier. However, financiers have also been mocked for their perceived tendency to generate wealth at the expense of others, and without engaging in tangible labor. For example, humorist George Helgesen Fitch described the financier as "a man who can make two dollars grow for himself where one grew for someone else before".

== See also ==
- Accredited investor – Investor with a special legal status
- Compound interest – Compounding sum paid for the use of money
- Crowd funding – Collection of finance from backers to fund an initiative
- Financial literacy – Ability to make informed choices about money
- Institutional investor – Investors who invest professionally and as their main occupation in the stock market
- Investor–state dispute settlement – Rules for suing countries by foreign investors
- Growth capital – Type of private equity investment
- Model audit – Colloquial term for the tasks performed when conducting due diligence on a financial model
- Philanthrocapitalism – Method of philanthropy that mirrors a for-profit business
- Real estate investing – Buying and selling real estate for profit
- Saving account – Type of bank account
- Securities offering – Discrete round of investment
- Socially responsible investing – Any investment strategy combining both financial performance and social/ethical impact
- Stock investor – Person or company involved in trading equity securities
- Time value of money – Better to receive money now than later
