= Caissa Capital =

Hedge fund

Caissa Capital was a hedge fund founded by Jonathan Kinlay in 2002, based on his research on volatility arbitrage in the late 1990s. In addition to Kinlay, who was head of research and portfolio management, the management team comprised International Chess Grandmaster Ron Henley as head of trade execution and Paul Wilmott as risk manager. The fund's strategies used models that were developed by Kinlay's research firm Investment Analytics. Caissa, which managed $400M in assets for institutional investors such as Bank of America, was ranked by Fimat as the top performing fund in its class in 2004, but closed shortly after Kinlay's departure.

In August 2004, Kinlay sold his interest in Caissa to his partners in order to focus on his statistical arbitrage fund, but later brought a lawsuit against them, alleging that they had conspired to cause the collapse of the fund in order to establish their own competing fund. The lawsuit was settled in 2010.

In 2017, an unrelated international restructuring company called Caissa Capital was founded by Grant Lyon, Craig Hansen and Peter Kaufman.
