= Jonathan Kinlay =

Jonathan Kinlay is a quantitative researcher and hedge fund manager. He is founder and CEO of Systematic Strategies, LLC, a systematic hedge fund that deploys high-frequency trading strategies using news-based algorithms.

Kinlay was the founder and General Partner of the Caissa Capital hedge fund, whose volatility arbitrage strategies were developed by Kinlay's investment research firm, Investment Analytics. Caissa, which managed $400M in assets, was ranked by FIMAT as the top performing fund in its class in 2004. Kinlay went on to establish the Proteom Capital, whose statistical arbitrage strategies were based on pattern recognition techniques used in DNA sequencing. Kinlay was formerly Global Head of Model Review at the US investment bank Bear Stearns.

Kinlay holds a PhD in economics and has held positions on the faculty of New York University's Stern School of Business, Carnegie Mellon University and Reading University. Kinlay is a regular conference speaker and writer on investment research, hedge fund investing and quantitative finance. Kinlay was a member of England's chess team that won gold in the World Student Olympiad in Mexico in 1978 and won the British Under-18 Chess Championship in 1973. He is the son of Fleet Street editor James Kinlay and father of British actress Antonia Kinlay.

== Education ==
In 1979, Kinlay earned his MS in statistics at University of Sheffield. Then later earned his MBA major in Finance and Financial Management Services at London Business School, year 1995. In early 2005, he earned his latest degree of PhD in economics at Bristol University.

== Research and publications ==
- Equity Analytics, Jun 2023 ISBN 9798394997969
- Estimating Historical Volatility, Mar 2005
- Meta Strategies and Their Applications, Mar 2023
- Can Machine Learning Techniques Be Used to Predict Market Direction? - the 1,000,000 Model Test, Jun 2023
- Synthetic Market Data and Its Applications, Mar 2023
- Modeling Asset Volatility, Feb 2023
- Volatility Forecasting in Emerging Markets, Mar 2023
- Range-Based EGARCH Option Pricing Models, Jan 2011
- "Metal Logic", in Seeking Alpha, August 23, 2016
- "Trading The Presidential Election", in Seeking Alpha, July 27, 2016
- "Beating Amazon", in Seeking Alpha, July 25, 2016
- "Crash Proof Investing", in Seeking Alpha, July 22, 2016
- "Developing A Volatility Carry Strategy", in Seeking Alpha, July 15, 2016
- "Investing In Leveraged ETFs - Theory And Practice", in Seeking Alpha, May 5, 2015
- "Creating Robust, High-Performance Stock Portfolios" in Seeking Alpha , Jul 31 2014
- "Enhancing Mutual Fund Returns With Market Timing" in Seeking Alpha , Jul 17 2014
- "How To Bulletproof Your Portfolio" in Seeking Alpha , Jul 10 2014
- Interview with Jonathan Kinlay on Systematic Strategies in Active Trader Magazine, Nov 2010
- "Long Memory and Regime Shifts in Asset Volatility" in The Best of Wilmott 1: Incorporating the Quantitative Finance Review Wiley, 2004, ISBN 978-0-470-02351-8
- Sicilian, Keres Attack, BT Batsford, 1981, ISBN 0-7134-2139-8
- Market Timing and Return Prediction, Investment Research Report, Vol 1, Issue 1, 2001
- Modelling Volatility: The State of the ARCH, Investment Research Report, Vol 1, Issue 2, 2001
- Estimating the Forward Term Structure, Investment Research Report, Vol 1, Issue 3, 2001
- The Returns to Risk Arbitrage, Investment Research Report, Vol 1, Issue 3, 2001
- Long Memory in Financial Markets, Investment Research Report, Vol 2, Issue 1, 2002
- Detecting Regime Shifts, Investment Research Report, Vol 2, Issue 1, 2002
- "Long Memory and Regime Shifts in Asset Volatility", Wilmott, Jan/Feb 2003
