= Financial Modelers' Manifesto =

The Financial Modelers' Manifesto was a proposal for more responsibility in risk management and quantitative finance written by financial engineers Emanuel Derman and Paul Wilmott. The manifesto includes a Modelers' Hippocratic Oath. The structure of the Financial Modelers' Manifesto mirrors that of The Communist Manifesto of 1848.

The Manifesto and Oath were written in response to the 2008 financial crisis with the collapse of subprime mortgages. A shortened version was published in Business Week in December 2008 with the complete version appearing shortly afterwards; the full text is available here.

Note that both authors had written extensively about the risks related to financial models for several years before the crisis; for example:

Emanuel Derman in 1996:

"There are always implicit assumptions behind a model and its solution method. But human beings have limited foresight and great imagination, so that, inevitably, a model will be used in ways its creator never intended. This is especially true in trading environments… but it’s also a matter of principle: you just cannot foresee everything. So, even a “correct” model, “correctly” solved, can lead to problems. The more complex the model, the greater this possibility."

Paul Wilmott in 2000:

"Unfortunately, as the mathematics of finance reaches higher levels so the level of common sense seems to drop. There have been some well publicised cases of large losses sustained by companies because of their lack of understanding of financial instruments…. It is clear that a major rethink is desperately required if the world is to avoid a mathematician-led market meltdown."

== See also ==
- Unreasonable ineffectiveness of mathematics § Economics and finance
- Mathematical finance § Criticism
- Financial economics § Challenges and criticism
- Physics envy
- Hippocratic Oath for scientists
