= Financial Modeling World Cup =

Financial modeling esports competition, using Microsoft Excel

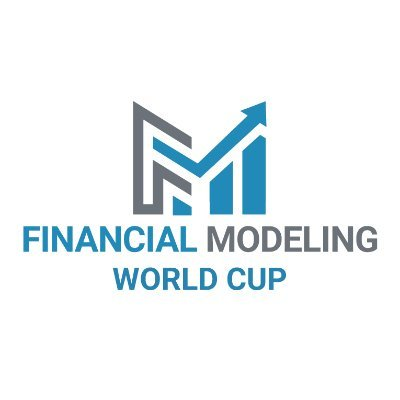
- Status: Active
- Genre: Esports
- Frequency: Annually
- Years active: September 2020; 6 years ago
- Inaugurated: September 2020; 6 years ago
- Founder: Andrew Grigolyunovich
- Website: fmworldcup.com

The Financial Modeling World Cup (FMWC) is an organization that hosts various Microsoft Excel–based competitions.

The FMWC held its first competition in September 2020 and currently hosts three competitions:

- Financial Modeling World Cup (FMWC)
- Microsoft Excel World Championship (MEWC)
- Microsoft Excel Collegiate Challenge (MECC)

== Financial Modeling World Cup (FMWC) ==
=== Description, competition format, and scoring ===
FMWC is an annual Excel modeling competition.

During the course of a season (January through November), competitors complete eight stages of modeling problems, and are allotted two hours over a 48-hour window to complete each stage. Each stage contains three case studies, one to five pages long, with multiple choice or fill-in questions at the end. Contrary to what the name suggests, not all case studies are financial modeling based; many are business modeling or data modeling based.

Stage points are available for:

- Task: Correctly solving questions on each case (points vary by question)
- Time: Completing the stage early (10 points per minute, awarded only if the competitor has scored 900 task points)

Each stage winner's score is normalized to 1,000 points, and the score of all other competitors are normalized accordingly.

FMWC rankings and final standings are based on points scored across each competitor's top 6 stage scores (the bottom 2 stage scores are dropped).

=== Format changes ===
- 2020: The first of four FMWC stages started in September 2020. All stages contributed to the final standings.
- 2021: The stage count increased to twelve. The bottom two stages for each competitor were dropped from the final standings.
- 2022: The stage count decreased to eight. Case authors could not score a higher time bonus than any other player. Stage score normalization was introduced. The prize for top company was eliminated.
- 2023: For each stage, case authors may not score more points than the best player playing full-time.
- 2024: Case authors write cases for an entire stage and are automatically awarded 1,000 points for that stage. They can create cases for no more than 1 stage and are ineligible for prize money in the stage where their cases are used.
- 2025: The FMWC Championship Ring is no longer awarded to the Financial Modeling World Cup Champion.

=== Competition statistics ===
Year	Registrations (Note: Competitors that have registered for at least one stage, not necessarily for the entire competition)	Participants (Note: Competitors that have attempted at least one stage. A stage score of 0 indicates participation, while a blank stage score does not)	Maximum completed number of stages (Note: Competitors that attempted the maximum number of stages contributing to the final season point total (i.e., the 2021 season had 12 stages, but only the top 10 results determined a competitors season point total. In 2021, 307 competitors participated in at least 10 FMWC stages.))	Prize pool (USD)
2020	125	117	36	$10,000
2021	333	307	72	$20,000
2022	443	402	136	$25,000
2023	401	363	136	$25,000

=== Results ===
Key
Score dropped from final rankings per FMWC rules

2020
Rank	Name	Nation	Age Group	1	2	3	4	Total	Prize
1st place, gold medalist(s)	Joseph Lau	Australia	Masters	785	1,285	795	2,670	5,535	$3,000
2nd place, silver medalist(s)	Diarmuid Early	United States	Open	825	1,260	1,035	1,650	4,770	$2,000
3rd place, bronze medalist(s)	Andrew Ngai	Great Britain	Open		1,160	880	2,670	4,710	$1,000
4	John Lim	Australia	Open	605	890	735	2,290	4,520	
5	Christian Hueber	Austria	Open	470	1,105	805	2,105	4,485	
6	Anup Agarwal	India	Open		1,000	955	2525	4,480	
7	Samir Asadov	Ireland	Open	520	1,025	555	2050	4,150	
8	Joseph Michael Palisoc	United States	Open	655	885	805	1,750	4,095	
9	Dan Mayoh	Australia	Open	620	875	720	1,850	4,065	
10	Willem Gerritsen	Netherlands	Masters	655	845	825	1,475	3,800	

2021
Rank	Name	Nation	Age Group	1	2	3	4	5	6	7	8	9	10	11	12	Total	Prize
1st place, gold medalist(s)	Diarmuid Early	United States	Open	1,170	1,015	1,160	1,165	865	1,510	1,260	970	815	1,145	1,440	1,090	11,925	$5,000
2nd place, silver medalist(s)	Anup Agarwal	India	Open	1,105	790	1,460	1,065	865	1,265	835	1,175	535	1,005	1,550	850	11,175	$2,000
3rd place, bronze medalist(s)	Andrew Ngai	Australia	Open	1,200	735	820	765	1,315	1,265	1,030	1,140	820	1,325	1,300	635	10,980	$1,000
4	Jeff Heng Siang Tan	Malaysia	Open	495	485	1,290	530	1,145	1,230	650	1,250	530	1,460	1,190	1,350	10,625	$500
5	Willem Gerritsen	Netherlands	Open	1,275	605	720	750	885	1,200	1,210	1,070	720	1,060	1,350	850	10,370	$500
6	Michael Jarman	Canada	Open	825	820	1,300	765	895	1,170	895	1,040	867		1,420	1,090	10,322	$500
7	Christian Hueber	Austria	Open		725	1,130	925	865	830	670	1,035	615	970	1,305	850	9,305	$500
8	Janis Reinis Beikmanis	Latvia	U-25	645	760	840	1,178	795	830	0	820	625	765	1,285	1,371	9,289	$350
9	Joseph Michael Palisoc	United States	Open	725	560	675	610	1,015	840	680	840	605	1,130	1,400	875	8,790	$350
10	Sameer Jagetia	United States	Open	705	650	821	685	1,040	945	670	920	570	950	1,330	563	8,716	$350

2022
Rank	Name	Nation	Age Group	1	2	3	4	5	6	7	8	Total	Prize
1st place, gold medalist(s)	Laurence Lau	United States	Open	1,000	957	1,000	959	1,000	1,000	769	978	5,937	$7,000
2nd place, silver medalist(s)	Diarmuid Early	Ireland	Open	821	1,000	830	1,000	885	956	1,000	1,000	5,841	$4,000
3rd place, bronze medalist(s)	Andrew Ngai	Australia	Open	847	899	815	838	971	803	974	883	5,412	$2,000
4	Michael Jarman	Canada	Open	898	670	596	775	899	956	968	780	5,276	$1,000
5	Willem Gerritsen	Netherlands	Open	740	790	237	622	795	646	788	834	4,593	$800
6	Joseph Michael Palisoc	United States	Open	809	576	737	779	676	507	840	713	4,554	$750
7	Anup Agarwal	India	Open	694	634	526	712	849	697	840	749	4,541	$700
8	Tim Roberts	Great Britain	Open	762	778	593	698	835			700	4,366	$650
9	Matthew Fried	Australia	Open	821		611		694	646	878	686	4,336	$600
10	Paul Dent	Great Britain	Open	587	833	619	734	705	500	644	794	4,329	$550

2023
Rank	Name	Nation	Age Group	1	2	3	4	5	6	7	8	Total	Prize
1st place, gold medalist(s)	Laurence Lau	United States	Open	654	1,000	1,000	1,000	1,000	1,000	1,000	1,000	6,000	$7,000
2nd place, silver medalist(s)	Diarmuid Early	Ireland	Open	917	885	857	993	588	717	597	972	5,341	$4,000
3rd place, bronze medalist(s)	Michael Jarman	Canada	Open	1,000	685	573	626	713	683	1,000	818	4,899	$2,000
4	Andrew Ngai	Australia	Open	857	943	835	685	555	675	653	805	4,800	$1,000
5	Willem Gerritsen	Netherlands	Open	895	762	570	664	581	663	586	610	4,180	$800
6	Joseph Michael Palisoc	United States	Open	624	685	638	392	651	650	634	850	4,108	$750
7	Paul Dent	Great Britain	Open	699	697	710	483	592	654	586	649	4,001	$700
8	Michael Clarke	New Zealand	Open	669	782	631	556	614	683		617	3,996	$650
9	Matthew Fried	Australia	Open	763	698	530	392	544	763	474	617	3,915	$600
10	Harry Gross	Great Britain	U-25	586	1000	527	318	585	446	500	624	3,822	$550

== Microsoft Excel World Championship (MEWC) ==
=== 2021 ===
The MEWC began in 2021 as the FMWC Open, an Excel Esports tournament. The competition was a standalone event that did not impact the Financial Modeling World Cup rankings in regular seasons.

The tournament began with a qualification round, with the top 128 qualifiers advancing to a single elimination tournament.

Qualification rounds began on November 13, and continued into December. The last three rounds of the FMWC Open competition were held on December 11, 2021, and were broadcast on the FMWC YouTube channel and ESPN3. Andrew Ngai (now representing Australia), Anup Agarwal (India), and Michael Jarman (Canada) returned as quarterfinals qualifiers, and Harry Gross from the UK, Jason Moore from the US, Joseph Palisoc from the US, Sameer Jagetia from the US, and Tim Roberts from the UK also qualified. The final round, entitled "Knights and Warriors", had contestants, each representing a fictional nation, send fictional warriors to conquer each other. Ngai defeated Jarman 734–280, with a maximum of 1,000 points per side.

=== 2022 ===
The FMWC Open was rebranded as the Microsoft Excel World Championship (MEWC). Like its predecessor, it also consisted of a qualification round and the top 128 qualifiers advancing to a single elimination tournament.

==== Qualification results (Top 50) ====
In total, 377 people took part and 128 qualified for the final round. The best ranked participants of the FMWC rankings were prequalified.

Rank	Name	Total points	Time
1	(Netherlands) Willem Gerritsen	5,000	00:36:50
2	(New Zealand) Michael Clarke	5,000	00:46:59
3	(Canada) Michael Holmes	5,000	00:51:01
4	(United States) Brian Hanley	5,000	00:51:28
5	(Spain) Alfons Oliver Altes	5,000	00:52:23
6	(Canada) Justin Merson	5,000	00:54:51
7	(United States) Brittany Deaton	5,000	00:54:57
8	(South Africa) Jason Webber	5,000	00:55:02
9	(Spain) Eduardo Gonazales Arias	5,000	00:55:32
10	(United Kingdom) Peter Rebecchi	5,000	00:55:57
11	(United States) David Brown	5,000	00:56:49
12	(India) Stefanus Ng	5,000	00:59:28
13	(United States) Diarmuid Early	4,800	00:25:14
14	(United Kingdom) Paul Dent	4,600	00:50:55
15	(France) Nicolas Micot	4,600	00:52:31
16	(United States) Nick McCartney	4,600	00:54:55
17	(United States) Lianna Gerrish	4,600	00:57:34
18	(Belgium) Bram Van Eeckhout	4,600	00:58:14
19	(Australia) Matthew Fried	4,550	00:50:17
20	(Spain) Isaac Mendez Cortinas	4,400	00:56:55
21	(United States) Emad Oughourli	4,300	00:59:18
22	(United Kingdom) Tom Vincent	4,300	01:00:00
23	(United States) Michael Thanasides	4,300	01:00:00
24	(India) Dhara Shah	4,200	00:59:28
25	(China) Ben Gutscher	4,100	00:43:06
26	(Australia) Toby Funston	4,050	00:59:59
27	(United Kingdom) David Rosel	4,000	00:45:38
28	(United States) Dan Seiders	4,000	00:56:40
29	(Netherlands) Albert Blom	4,000	00:57:31
30	(United States) Harry Seiders	4,000	00:57:31
31	(United States) Taylor Robinson	4,000	00:58:23
32	(United States) Mary Brown	4,000	00:58:23
33	(Canada) Patrick Chatain	4,000	00:58:43
34	(Latvia) Aleksandrs Goba	4,000	00:59:00
35	(Mexico) Ricardo Domínguez	4,000	00:59:09
36	(Russia) Grigoriy Korkishko	4,000	00:59:28
37	(Hungary) Zsolt Mogyorósi	4,000	00:59:49
38	(United States) Joseph Michael Palisoc	4,000	00:59:52
39	(United States) Luke Moraga	4,000	01:00:00
40	(United States) Nick Lowman	3,975	00:59:01
41	(United Kingdom) Jaq Kennedy	3,875	00:59:48
42	(Egypt) Khaled Habib	3,800	00:59:36
43	(United States) Ben deLeon	3,800	00:59:39
44	(Poland) Jakub Pomykalski	3,800	00:59:50
45	(France) Pierre Sertin	3,675	00:59:50
46	(South Africa) Steyn Wolmarans	3,600	00:49:04
47	(United States) Bob Schriver	3,600	00:52:22
48	(Austria) Christian Hueber	3,600	00:54:19
49	(Japan) Jason Naniong	3,600	00:57:51
50	(United Kingdom) Ryan Bains	3,600	00:58:01

==== Bracket ====
Round of 128

Round of 64

Round of 32

Round of 16

Quarter-finals

Semi-finals

Final

(Australia) Andrew Ngai
676

(Hong Kong) Alvin Siu Hin Lui
188

(Australia) Andrew Ngai
676

(China) Ben Gutscher
484

(Philippines) Princess Camille Ong
72

(China) Ben Gutscher
664

(Australia) Andrew Ngai
780

(Australia) Peter Li
189

(New Zealand) Cheong Ng
232

(Australia) Peter Li
664

(Australia) Peter Li
676

(Australia) Steve Schulz
272

(United Kingdom) Harry Gross
84

(Australia) Steve Schulz
664

(Australia) Andrew Ngai
346

(Australia) Min Chen
104

(France) Nicolas Micot
640

(India) Vineet Sharma
0

(France) Nicolas Micot
220

(Austria) Christian Hueber
319

(Australia) Toby Funston
137

(Austria) Christian Hueber
284

(Austria) Christian Hueber
251

(Australia) Min Chen
620

(Spain) Isaac Méndez Cortiias
676

(Australia) John Lim
317

(Spain) Isaac Méndez Cortifas
272

(Australia) Min Chen
489

(Australia) Min Chen
664

(Madagascar) Kiraén Andriamandimbisoa
284

(Australia) Andrew Ngai
1,250

(United States) Kenneth Wang
760

(Canada) Justin Merson
664

(Poland) Gabriela Stroj (W)
980

(Poland) Gabriela Stroj (W)
453

(United States) Ben Rotblatt
253

(United Kingdom) Ben Pridmore
124

(United States) Ben Rotblatt
302

(Poland) Gabriela Stroj (W)
224

(United States) David Scully
174

(Argentina) Joaquin Courreges
680

(United States) David Scully
716

(United States) David Scully
474

(Germany) Joris Greiwe
220

(Canada) Stephen Xiao
22

(Germany) Joris Greiwe
295

(Poland) Gabriela Stroj (W)
178

(United States) Kenneth Wang
420

(United States) Harry Seiders
692

(United States) Sameer Jagetia
781

(United States) Sameer Jagetia
504

(United Kingdom) Jaq Kennedy
552

(Spain) Sergio Travieso
260

(United Kingdom) Jaq Kennedy
716

(United Kingdom) Jaq Kennedy
360

(United States) Kenneth Wang
530

(United Kingdom) Julie Bowden (SE)
680

(Brazil) / (South Africa) T.Silva/R. Wessels
652

(United Kingdom) Julie Bowden (SE)
219

(United States) Kenneth Wang
811

(United States) Kenneth Wang
1105

(United Kingdom) Paul Dent
1105

(Australia) Andrew Ngai
615

(United States) Brittany Deaton
610

(United States) Joseph Michael Palisoc
1105

(Canada) Mackenzie Dixon
159

(United States) Joseph Michael Palisoc
680

(United States) Katelyn Stienen
640

(United States) Stephanie Annerose
431

(United States) Katelyn Stienen
460

(United States) Joseph Michael Palisoc
676

(Spain) Eduardo Gonzalez Arias
224

(Ukraine) Samir Asadov
704

(United States) Brian Hanley
757

(United States) Brian Hanley
367

(Spain) Eduardo Gonzalez Arias
652

(Poland) Jakub Pomykalski
568

(Spain) Eduardo Gonzalez Arias
769

(United States) Joseph Michael Palisoc
510

(United States) Jason Hutcheson
242

(United States) Dan Seiders
640

(United Kingdom) Neil Foot
482

(United States) Dan Seiders
284

(United States) Jason Hutcheson
471

(United States) Jason Hutcheson
757

(United Kingdom) Steve Hales
640

(United States) Jason Hutcheson
506

(United States) David Brown
295

(United States) Kyle Glovinsky
590

(United Kingdom) William Freestone
680

(United Kingdom) William Freestone
179

(United States) David Brown
295

(United States) Nick McCartney
420

(United States) David Brown
1105

(United States) Joseph Michael Palisoc
1,000

(United States) Brittany Deaton
1,250

(Germany) Fanny Caillot
664

(United States) Morgan Carr
471

(Germany) Fanny Caillot
262

(United States) Brittany Deaton
735

(United States) Brittany Deaton
1000

(Canada) Thomas Keane
220

(United States) Brittany Deaton
770

(United States) JP Delavin
0

(United States) JP Delavin
692

(United Kingdom) David Rosel
680

(United States) JP Delavin
640

(Latvia) Aleksandrs Goba
250

(United States) Nathan Cunningham
484

(Latvia) Aleksandrs Goba
745

(United States) Brittany Deaton
405

(United Kingdom) Andrew Biglowe
328

(Argentina) Juan Pablo Brea
525

(United States) Michael Thanasides
432

(Argentina) Juan Pablo Brea
286

(Canada) Patrick Chatain
250

(Canada) Patrick Chatain
568

(Canada) Tyler Hargrave
0

(Argentina) Juan Pablo Brea
424

(United Kingdom) Andrew Biglowe
556

(United States) Nick Tone
260

(United Kingdom) Andrew Biglowe
692

(United Kingdom) Andrew Biglowe
775

(United Kingdom) Tim Roberts (4)
610

(France) Pierre Sertin
680

(United Kingdom) Tim Roberts
1040

(Australia) Andrew Ngai
1,250

(Australia) Matthew Fried
420

(Canada) Michael Jarman
1105

(Netherlands) Lyanne van Dijk
492

(Canada) Michael Jarman
674

(Hungary) Adam Reichenbach
82

(United States) Nick Lowman
534

(Hungary) Adam Reichenbach
745

(Canada) Michael Jarman
744

(United States) Jesi Lipp
0

(United States) Bob Schriver
326

(United States) Jesi Lipp
640

(United States) Jesi Lipp
640

(United States) Bryan Ferrier
444

(United States) Martin Rydder
220

(United States) Bryan Ferrier
500

(Canada) Michael Jarman
670

(United States) Ben deLeon
243

(United States) Jack Graham
420

(Netherlands) Martijn Adriaanse
640

(Netherlands) Martijn Adriaanse
470

(United States) Andrew Luchenbach
250

(Egypt) Khaled Habib
240

(United States) Andrew Luchenbach
692

(Netherlands) Martijn Adriaanse
530

(United States) Ben deLeon
784

(United States) Ben deLeon
757

(United States) Lianna Gerrish
664

(United States) Ben deLeon
775

(United States) Jack Franken
640

(Netherlands) Peter van Veen
344

(United States) Jack Franken
781

(Canada) Michael Jarman
1,200

(New Zealand) Michael Clarke
770

(New Zealand) Michael Clarke
640

(South Africa) Jason Webber
189

(New Zealand) Michael Clarke
478

(Australia) Nataly Falero
232

(Belgium) Bram Van Eeckhout
220

(Australia) Nataly Falero
420

(New Zealand) Michael Clarke
653

(South Africa) Steyn Wolmarans
395

Grigoriy Korkishko
94

(South Africa) Steyn Wolmarans
107

(South Africa) Steyn Wolmarans
309

(India) Dhara Shah
250

(South Africa) Gareth Watson
42

(India) Dhara Shah
284

(New Zealand) Michael Clarke
379

(Netherlands) Willem Gerritsen
242

(Spain) Alfons Oliver Altes
263

(Hungary) Zsolt Mogyorösi
84

(Spain) Alfons Oliver Altes
319

(Thailand) Pichaya Pan-anukooln
273

(Japan) Jason Naniong
208

(Thailand) Pichaya Pan-anukooln
243

(Spain) Alfons Oliver Altes
653

(Netherlands) Willem Gerritsen
830

(United Kingdom) Peter Rebecchi
114

(China) Chris Wilson
119

(China) Chris Wilson
455

(Netherlands) Willem Gerritsen
676

(Netherlands) Jan Mooijer
84

(Netherlands) Willem Gerritsen
676

(Canada) Michael Jarman
415

(Australia) Matthew Fried
914

(India) Anup Agarwal
610

(Netherlands) Albert Blom
84

(India) Anup Agarwal
813

(Denmark) Niels Christian Lundtoft
470

(Denmark) Niels Christian Lundtoft
420

(Poland) Jakub Hluzow
220

(India) Anup Agarwal
360

(Australia) Matthew Fried
830

(South Africa) Christopher Ashworth
319

(United Kingdom) Tom Vincent
84

(South Africa) Christopher Ashworth
319

(Australia) Matthew Fried
410

(Australia) Matthew Fried
640

(New Zealand) Nick Boberg
96

(Australia) Matthew Fried
407

(Australia) Liam Bastick (W)
240

(Italy) Lorenzo Foti
94

(Indonesia) Stefanus Ng
420

(Indonesia) Stefanus Ng
240

(Australia) Liam Bastick (W)
478

(Australia) Liam Bastick (W)
261

(Belgium) Kjell De Troye
84

(Australia) Liam Bastick (W)
457

(United Kingdom) Ryan Bains
389

(United Kingdom) Ryan Bains
232

(United Kingdom) Stephen Dunn
220

(United Kingdom) Ryan Bains
442

(Thailand) Bo Rydobon
250

(Kazakhstan) Gani Toleugazyyev
220

(Thailand) BO Rydobon
540

(Australia) Matthew Fried
986

(Canada) Michael Holmes
976

(United States) Mary Brown
640

(United States) Daric Harrington
260

(United States) Mary Brown
428

(United States) Shaun McCarthy
397

(United States) Luke Moraga
522

(United States) Shaun McCarthy
676

(United States) Mary Brown
316

(Australia) Dan Mayoh
310

(United States) Greg Hingsbergen
724

(Australia) Dan Mayoh
973

(Australia) Dan Mayoh
640

(France) Loic Coquer
18

(France) Loic Coquer
444

(United States) Norm Sheppard
300

(United States) Mary Brown
232

(Canada) Michael Holmes
405

(Costa Rica) Jelle Hettinga
460

(Austria) Adam Steiner
466

(Austria) Adam Steiner
220

(Canada) Michael Holmes
420

(Canada) Michael Holmes
1099

(Mexico) Ricardo Domínguez
280

(Canada) Michael Holmes
988

(United States) Diarmuid Early
834

(United States) Emad Oughourli
680

(United States) Taylor Robinson
704

(United States) Taylor Robinson
716

(United States) Diarmuid Early
1200

(United States) Robert Valentine
250

(United States) Diarmuid Early
1105

=== 2023 ===
The MEWC continued in 2023 with a modified format, the Qualification round was split into nine events, called "Road to Las Vegas" and one Qualification Round. However the 128 final-participants will still be competing in a 1v1 grid. The final of the top 8 will be hosted in Las Vegas.

==== Qualification results (Top 50) ====
In total, 377 people took part and 128 qualified for the final round. The best ranked participants of the FMWC ranking, were prequalified.

Rank	Name	Total points	Time
1	(United States) Brittany Deaton	10000	00:46:24
2	(France) Nicolas Micot	9915	00:46:45
3	(Italy) Lorenzo Foti	9715	00:53:52
4	(United States) Peter Scharl	9115	00:53:41
5	(United States) Jason Hutcheson	8830	00:58:19
6	(Canada) Adam Carter	8500	00:57:59
7	(United States) Katelyn Stienen	9315	01:00:00
8	(United Kingdom) Elliott Paterson	8200	00:58:07
9	(United States) Jacob Andrews	8200	01:00:00
10	(United States) Kyle Sutton	8000	00:57:13
11	(United States) Johnny Valeriote	8000	00:57:57
12	(Canada) Michael Holmes	8000	00:58:32
13	(France) Christophe Belin	7915	00:56:28
14	(United States) Kenneth Wang	7915	00:59:53
15	(United States) Jeremy Freelove	7850	01:00:00
16	(Spain) Alfons Oliver Altes	7700	00:55:16
17	(United States) Jesi Lipp	7650	00:56:05
18	(Philippines) Princess Camille Ong	7600	00:59:00
19	(United States) Harry Seiders	7600	00:59:04
20	(Thailand) Pakkapong Sricharoen	7600	00:59:22
21	(United Kingdom) Ben Pridmore	7565	00:51:35
22	(United States) Ben deLeon	7515	00:55:25
23	(United States) Sharon Parker	7480	01:00:00
24	(United Kingdom) Harry Watson	7415	01:00:00
25	(Netherlands) Lyanne van Dijk	7410	00:57:52
26	(South Africa) Alwyn Birkholtz	7335	00:49:28
27	(United States) Shaun McCarthy	7315	00:59:45
28	(United States) Matt Ficarra	7245	00:59:50
29	(United States) James Galbraith	7220	00:56:17
30	(United States) Will Demere	7215	00:59:40
31	(United States) Riley Flischel	7150	00:57:55
32	(Australia) Steve Schulz	7150	01:00:00
33	(Netherlands) Judith Droogsma	6785	00:52:50
34	(France) Charles Poulain	6715	01:00:00
35	(New Zealand) Nick Boberg	6700	00:59:01
36	(United Kingdom) James Blackham	6635	00:58:49
37	(Netherlands) Martijn Adriaanse	6485	00:59:34
38	(United States) Matt Melsen	6435	00:58:54
39	(United Kingdom) Oliver Lambert	6415	00:59:34
40	(Italy) Sergio Trifiletti	6415	00:59:49
41	(Mexico) Ricardo Dominguez	6405	00:59:57
42	(United States) Kristain Lindemann	6400	00:59:40
43	(United States) Brandon Moyer	6400	01:00:00
44	(West Germany) Grigoriy Korkishko	6345	00:59:18
45	(India) Prithviraj Mavani	6300	01:00:00
46	(United States) Andrew Heybruch	6250	01:00:00
47	(Hungary) Zsolt Mogyorósi	6215	00:59:39
48	(Poland) Jakub Pomykalski	6200	00:58:45
49	(South Africa) Jason Webber	6200	00:59:40
50	(Chile) Juan Cifuentes	6200	00:59:55

==== Bracket ====
The 2023 edition had a different format for the last three rounds. The knockout format was used for the first four rounds. The eight participants that won their Round of 16 match qualified for the in-person Finals in Las Vegas, where 8 more players would join them in a last-chance qualification round.

==== Section 1 ====
Round of 128
(Australia) Andrew Ngai	1250
(France) Pierre Sertin	420
(Australia) Dario Mavec	390
(United Kingdom) Jaq Kennedy	270
(Latvia) Janis ReinS Beikmanis	442
(Canada) Emlie Williams	470
(United Kingdom) James Blackham	102
(Italy) Serge Trifletti	420
(United Kingdom) Chris Wison	243
(Thailand) Bo Rydobon	443
(Australia) WII Nord	420
(New Zealand) Timothy Shue	591
(United Kingdom) Neil Foot	442
(Australia) Dan Mayoh	481
(Spain) Alfons Oliver Altes	470
(Netherlands) Lyanne van Dijk	194

Round of 64
(Australia) Andrew Ngai	902
(Australia) Dario Mavec	770
(Canada) Emlie Williams	316
(Italy) Serge Trifletti	640
(Thailand) Bo Rydobon	314
(New Zealand) Timothy Shue	802
(Australia) Dan Mayoh	220
(Spain) Alfons Oliver Altes	712

Round of 32
(Australia) Andrew Ngai	595
(Italy) Serge Trifletti	395
(New Zealand) Timothy Shue	474
(Spain) Alfons Oliver Altes	240

Round of 16
(Australia) Andrew Ngai	1215
(New Zealand) Timothy Shue	418

==== Section 2 ====
Round of 128
(Thailand) Pichaya Pan-anukooh	432
(United Kingdom) Elliott Paterson	916
(Réunion) Julien Lacaze	254
(Thailand) Pakkapong Sricharoen	652
(South Africa) Pieter Pienaar	481
(Poland) Jakub Pomykalski	497
(France) Charles Poulain	0
(Italy) Lorenzo Foti	668
(United Kingdom) Harry Watson	420
(New Zealand) Nick Boberg	503
(Philippines) Princess Camille Ong	0
(Philippines) Stevenson Yu	492
(South Africa) Alwyn Birkhottz	270
(Netherlands) Henriette Hamer	110
(India) Anup Agarwal	664
(United Kingdom) Harry Gross	676

Round of 64
(United Kingdom) Elliott Paterson	720
(Thailand) Pakkapong Sricharoen	720
(Poland) Jakub Pomykalski	896
(Italy) Lorenzo Foti	323
(New Zealand) Nick Boberg	362
(Philippines) Stevenson Yu	380
(South Africa) Alwyn Birkhottz	403
(United Kingdom) Harry Gross	494

Round of 32
(United Kingdom) Elliott Paterson	465
(Poland) Jakub Pomykalski	465
(Philippines) Stevenson Yu	520
(United Kingdom) Harry Gross	320

Round of 16
(Poland) Jakub Pomykalski	513
(Philippines) Stevenson Yu	393

==== Section 3 ====
Round of 128
(United Kingdom) Matthew Fried	0
(Sweden) Belin Christophe	209
(Spain) Jesi Lipp	410
(United States) Emad Oughourli	550
(Canada) Graydon Moore	250
(Canada) Chris Pipka	244
(United States) Kyle Sutton	392
(United States) Kevin Taylor	167
(United States) Jim Pappalardo	297
(United States) Brandon Moyer	610
(United States) Matt Ficarra	341
(South Africa) Reinier Wessels	166
(United States) Will Demere	227
(United States) J. Parker Garrison	36
(United States) Barbara Mauric	110
(United States) Nicholas Fox	690

Round of 64
(Sweden) Belin Christophe	416
(United States) Emad Oughourli	235
(Canada) Graydon Moore	178
(United States) Kyle Sutton	155
(United States) Brandon Moyer	270
(United States) Matt Ficarra	202
(United States) Will Demere	194
(United States) Nicholas Fox	141

Round of 32
(Sweden) Belin Christophe	488
(Canada) Graydon Moore	102
(United States) Brandon Moyer	583
(United States) Will Demere	492

Round of 16
(Sweden) Belin Christophe	342
(United States) Brandon Moyer	573

==== Section 4 ====
Round of 128
(United States) Tim Roberts	262
(Denmark) Anders Richter Lindén	353
(United States) Josep Amela Milian	238
(United States) Johnny Valeriote	432
(United States) Robert Guiher	84
(United States) Dan Seiders	306
(United States) Harry Seiders	376
(Austria) Adam Steiner	176
(United States) Sameer Jagetia	714
(United States) Andrew Heybruch	192
(United States) Joseph Michael Palisoc	332
(United States) Stephanie Annerose	232
(United States) Logan Witt	206
(Spain) Eduardo Gonzalez Arias	241
(United States) Lianna Gerrish	290
(Netherlands) Willem Gerritsen	746

Round of 64
(Denmark) Anders Richter Lindén	358
(United States) Johnny Valeriote	175
(United States) Dan Seiders	358
(United States) Harry Seiders	242
(United States) Sameer Jagetia	240
(United States) Joseph Michael Palisoc	245
(Spain) Eduardo Gonzalez Arias	164
(Netherlands) Willem Gerritsen	327

Round of 32
(Denmark) Anders Richter Lindén	327
(United States) Dan Seiders	238
(United States) Joseph Michael Palisoc	480
(Netherlands) Willem Gerritsen	676

Round of 16
(Denmark) Anders Richter Lindén	517
(Netherlands) Willem Gerritsen	532

==== Section 5 ====
Round of 128
(Canada) Michael Jarman	882
(United States) Kenneth Wang	1120
(United States) Matt O'Brien	60
(Brazil) Klinsmann Langhanz	306
(United States) Peter Scharl	376
(Mexico) Ricardo Domínguez	139
(United States) Jason Hutcheson	300
(United States) Kristain Lindemann	303
(United States) Katelyn Stienen	190
(Switzerland) Milos Pantic	70
(Canada) Michael Holmes	404
(Canada) Hayden Waller	664
(United Kingdom) Chris Clarke	770
(United States) Matt Melsen	238
(United States) Yun-Fei-Yang Liu	0
(Italy) Yiwei Cao	398

Round of 64
(United States) Kenneth Wang	335
(Brazil) Klinsmann Langhanz	105
(United States) Peter Scharl	294
(United States) Kristain Lindemann	114
(United States) Katelyn Stienen	288
(Canada) Hayden Waller	105
(United Kingdom) Chris Clarke	134
(Italy) Yiwei Cao	389

Round of 32
(United States) Kenneth Wang	700
(United States) Peter Scharl	804
(United States) Katelyn Stienen	404
(Italy) Yiwei Cao	357

Round of 16
(United States) Peter Scharl	598
(United States) Katelyn Stienen	342

==== Section 6 ====
Round of 128
(Hungary) Adam Reichenbach	431
(United Kingdom) Alexey Sviridov	431
(Singapore) Danny Whittaker	470
(China) Ben Gutscher	482
(Hungary) Zsolt Mogyorósi	470
(India) Prithviraj Mavani	482
(Australia) Edwin Hartono Limbri	481
(Netherlands) Judith Droogsma	420
(Australia) Steve Schulz	571
(Australia) Catherine Xu	493
(New Zealand) Cheong Ng	371
(Australia) Min Chen	916
(United Kingdom) Oliver Lambert	414
(Australia) John Lim	420
(United Kingdom) Ben Pridmore	420
(New Zealand) Michael Clarke	704

Round of 64
(Hungary) Adam Reichenbach	412
(China) Ben Gutscher	232
(India) Prithviraj Mavani	383
(Australia) Edwin Hartono Limbri	414
(Australia) Steve Schulz	370
(Australia) Min Chen	500
(Australia) John Lim	208
(New Zealand) Michael Clarke	890

Round of 32
(Hungary) Adam Reichenbach	423
(Australia) Edwin Hartono Limbri	470
(Australia) Min Chen	306
(New Zealand) Michael Clarke	503

Round of 16
(Australia) Edwin Hartono Limbri	366
(New Zealand) Michael Clarke	561

==== Section 7 ====
Round of 128
(United Kingdom) Paul Dent	640
(United States) David Brown	472
(United States) Ben deLeon	560
(Russia) Grigoriy Korkishko	158
(Greece) Thanasis Dogramatzidis	260
(Canada) Matthew Jeanos	130
(United States) Hack Franken	0
(United States) Taylor Robinson	310
(United States) Erick Meszaros-Jones	619
(United States) Greg Hingsbergen	250
(United States) Sharon Parker	640
(United States) Shaun McCarthy	190
(South Africa) Jason Webber	386
(Hungary) Nikolay Georgiev	120
(Netherlands) Martkin Adriaanse	374
(Canada) Adam Carter	481

Round of 64
(United Kingdom) Paul Dent	105
(United States) Ben deLeon	368
(Greece) Thanasis Dogramatzidis	105
(United States) Taylor Robinson	182
(United States) Erick Meszaros-Jones	185
(United States) Sharon Parker	105
(South Africa) Jason Webber	256
(Canada) Adam Carter	279

Round of 32
(United States) Ben deLeon	108
(United States) Taylor Robinson	594
(United States) Erick Meszaros-Jones	116
(Canada) Adam Carter	326

Round of 16
(United States) Taylor Robinson	450
(Canada) Adam Carter	624

==== Section 8 ====
Round of 128
(Canada) Patrick Chatain	556
(United States) Curtis Landry	231
(United States) Mike Kern	94
(United States) Jacob Andrews	220
(Chile) Juan Cifuentes	300
(Germany) Karsten Hartlieb	164
(France) Nicolas Micot	794
(United States) James Galbraith	256
(United States) Jacob de la Cruz	102
(Switzerland) Tianyu William Xiao	128
(United States) Brittany Deaton	662
(United States) Timothy Bralick	307
(Ukraine) Samir Asadov	198
(United States) Riley Flischel	470
(United States) Jeremy Freelove	515
(Republic of Ireland) Diarmuid Early	1050

Round of 64
(Canada) Patrick Chatain	199
(United States) Jacob Andrews	128
(Chile) Juan Cifuentes	0
(France) Nicolas Micot	105
(Switzerland) Tianyu William Xiao	221
(United States) Brittany Deaton	198
(United States) Riley Flischel	105
(Republic of Ireland) Diarmuid Early	810

Round of 32
(Canada) Patrick Chatain	334
(France) Nicolas Micot	410
(Switzerland) Tianyu William Xiao	273
(Republic of Ireland) Diarmuid Early	780

Round of 16
(France) Nicolas Micot	92
(Republic of Ireland) Diarmuid Early	840

=== 2024 ===
The structure for the 2024 Microsoft Excel World Championship was revamped in several areas, including for the qualification round. The number of players in the main event remained at 128. Qualification for the MEWC was as follows:

- 50 players, 5 in each of the 10 Excel Esports Battes (called the "Road to Las Vegas"). One player would qualify from the YouTube livestream, while four others would qualify from online participation.
- 16 players from the Financial Modeling World Cup.
- 60 players from the MEWC online qualification round.
- 2 wildcards.

==== Qualification results ====
The following participants qualified for the event:

2024 Road to Las Vegas series
Qualification method	Player	Score	Time (mm:ss)
Excel Esports Battle I "Doggie Daycare" January 25	(Republic of Ireland) Diarmuid Early (Note: Qualified via livestream)	1150	30:00
Excel Esports Battle I "Doggie Daycare" January 25	(United Kingdom) Chris Clarke	990	29:12
Excel Esports Battle I "Doggie Daycare" January 25	(Netherlands) Willem Gerritsen	980	29:11
Excel Esports Battle I "Doggie Daycare" January 25	(United States) Jacob Andrews	950	28:38
Excel Esports Battle I "Doggie Daycare" January 25	(Canada) Michael Jarman	940	28:40
Excel Esports Battle II "Sommelier" February 29	(United States) Colin Sheehe	1250	24:23
Excel Esports Battle II "Sommelier" February 29	(India) Anup Agarwal	1250	25:12
Excel Esports Battle II "Sommelier" February 29	(Italy) Sergio Trifiletti	1250	29:11
Excel Esports Battle II "Sommelier" February 29	(United Kingdom) Harry Gross	1250	29:45
Excel Esports Battle II "Sommelier" February 29	(United Kingdom) Elliott Paterson	1185	29:52
Excel Esports Battle III "This Spreadsheet is a Nightmare" March 28	(Australia) Andrew Ngai	1250	16:14
Excel Esports Battle III "This Spreadsheet is a Nightmare" March 28	(Thailand) Bo Rydobon	1250	28:57
Excel Esports Battle III "This Spreadsheet is a Nightmare" March 28	(Germany) Jean Wolleh	1167	30:00
Excel Esports Battle III "This Spreadsheet is a Nightmare" March 28	(Canada) Adam Carter	1128	27:25
Excel Esports Battle III "This Spreadsheet is a Nightmare" March 28	(New Zealand) Nick Boberg	975	30:00
Excel Esports Battle IV "Ship the World" April 25	(United States) Peter Scharl	1250	25:44
Excel Esports Battle IV "Ship the World" April 25	(Poland) Jakub Pomykalski	1191	30:00
Excel Esports Battle IV "Ship the World" April 25	(Denmark) Anders Richter Lindén	1110	30:00
Excel Esports Battle IV "Ship the World" April 25	(Italy) Lorenzo Foti	1065	24:25
Excel Esports Battle IV "Ship the World" April 25	(United States) Jack Franken	1058	30:00
Excel Esports Battle V "Deep Sea Diving" May 30	(Thailand) Pakkapong Sricharoen	1190	29:39
Excel Esports Battle V "Deep Sea Diving" May 30	Julien Lacaze	1191	30:00
Excel Esports Battle V "Deep Sea Diving" May 30	(United Kingdom) Hadyn Wiseman	938	29:59
Excel Esports Battle V "Deep Sea Diving" May 30	(United States) Jeremy Freelove	938	30:00
Excel Esports Battle V "Deep Sea Diving" May 30	(Hungary) Adam Reichenbach	830	30:00
Excel Esports Battle VI "The Simple Case" June 20	(Madagascar) Ny Tsiory Rakotonanahary	1170	19:02
Excel Esports Battle VI "The Simple Case" June 20	(Netherlands) Jasper van Merle	1140	20:51
Excel Esports Battle VI "The Simple Case" June 20	(Greece) Thanasis Dogramatzidis	770	29:55
Excel Esports Battle VI "The Simple Case" June 20	(United Kingdom) Paul Dent	400	30:00
Excel Esports Battle VI "The Simple Case" June 20	(New Zealand) Timothy Shue	233	30:00
Excel Esports Battle VII "I am Left-Handed" July 25	(United States) Nick Lowman	1250	29:58
Excel Esports Battle VII "I am Left-Handed" July 25	(Australia) Tze Sheng Yeo	1159	28:23
Excel Esports Battle VII "I am Left-Handed" July 25	(Chile) Juan Cifuentes	1159	29:50
Excel Esports Battle VII "I am Left-Handed" July 25	(United States) Brian Wright	1110	29:50
Excel Esports Battle VII "I am Left-Handed" July 25	(India) Vikram Hattangady	880	30:00
Excel Esports Battle VIII "Treasure Hunt" August 29	(Australia) Grayson Huynh	1250	16:07
Excel Esports Battle VIII "Treasure Hunt" August 29	(Austria) Benjamin Weber	1250	17:43
Excel Esports Battle VIII "Treasure Hunt" August 29	(China) Ben Gutscher	1250	19:16
Excel Esports Battle VIII "Treasure Hunt" August 29	(United States) Matt Stockton	1250	20:40
Excel Esports Battle VIII "Treasure Hunt" August 29	(Madagascar) Cédric Morgan Rasolofo	1250	21:09
Excel Esports Battle IX "Census" September 19	(United States) Brittany Deaton	1184	29:19
Excel Esports Battle IX "Census" September 19	(United States) Taylor Robinson	1030	28:03
Excel Esports Battle IX "Census" September 19	(Poland) Kamil Ciesielski	950	29:15
Excel Esports Battle IX "Census" September 19	(Australia) Min Chen	950	29:37
Excel Esports Battle IX "Census" September 19	(United States) Fritz Burkhardt	601	30:00
Excel Esports Battle X "Almost There" October 10	(United States) Eric Ashton	1043	29:30
Excel Esports Battle X "Almost There" October 10	(Canada) Michael Holmes	894	28:53
Excel Esports Battle X "Almost There" October 10	(China) Zhang Yunyi	885	28:32
Excel Esports Battle X "Almost There" October 10	(United Kingdom) Harry Watson	858	29:35
Excel Esports Battle X "Almost There" October 10	(United States) Alexander Freedman	818	29:39

2024 Financial Modeling World Cup Qualifiers (Top 16)
Rank	Player	Season Score
5	(Australia) Matthew Fried	4737
6	(United States) Joseph Michael Palisoc	4573
7	(United Kingdom) Tim Roberts	4437
8	(Australia) Steve Schultz	4427
16	(Spain) Eduardo Gonzalez Arias	3897

2024 MEWC qualification results
Region	Player	Score	Time (mm:ss)
Africa	(South Africa) Steyn Wolmarans	4380	59:39
Africa	(South Africa) Jason Webber	3750	59:20
Africa	(South Africa) Renier Wessels	3605	59:55
Asia-Pacific (Note: Due to time differences, the Asia-Pacific competition took place at 8:00 AM BST, while the other regions competed at 5:00 PM BST.)	(Philippines) Stevenson Yu	6500	54:53
Asia-Pacific	(New Zealand) Logan Clarke	6425	59:26
Asia-Pacific	(Singapore) Danny Whittaker	6415	60:00
Asia-Pacific	(Philippines) Princess Camille Ong	5590	60:00
Asia-Pacific	(New Zealand) Cheong Ng	5450	57:30
Asia-Pacific	(Indonesia) Calvin Lim	5375	56:53
Asia-Pacific	(Australia) Toby Funston	5290	57:35
Asia-Pacific	(India) Prithviraj Mavani	5190	60:00
Asia-Pacific	(Singapore) Min Min Chua	5100	60:00
Asia-Pacific	(Thailand) Pichaya Pan-anukooln	4875	54:59
Asia-Pacific	(Australia) Robert Buemmer	4350	55:51
Asia-Pacific	(Singapore) Kai Wei Lim	4275	58:38
Europe	(Luxembourg) Yiwei Cao	5510	59:54
Europe	(Hungary) Zsolt Mogyorósi	5500	59:55
Europe	(United Kingdom) Karim Awenat	5290	60:00
Europe	(Hungary) Marton Hunyady	4605	60:00
Europe	(France) Nicolas Micot	4450	60:00
Europe	(United Kingdom) Ben Pridmore	4400	53:00
Europe	(United Kingdom) Edwin Brown	4380	59:39
Europe	(United Kingdom) Chris Wilson	4350	60:00
Europe	(Russia) Grigoriy Korkishko	3950	59:50
Europe	(Republic of Ireland) Jeroen Adriaanse	3930	58:55
Europe	(Estonia) Siim Aksel Amer	3800	59:22
Europe	(Netherlands) Martijn Adriaanse	3600	58:13
Europe	(Denmark) Søren Nielsen	3600	59:05
Europe	(United Kingdom) Toby Julyan	3475	57:21
Europe	(United Kingdom) Tom Vincent	3460	60:00
Europe	(Ukraine) Samir Asadov	3350	59:24
Europe	(France) Etienne Corget	3300	60:00
Europe	(United Kingdom) William Freestone	3255	57:49
Europe	(Germany) Fanny Caillot	3150	56:49
Europe	(United Kingdom) Arnold Miron	3150	59:32
Europe	(United Kingdom) Francois Neethling	3120	60:00
Europe	(Austria) Jörg Profanter	3050	60:00
North America	(United States) Ben Carr	5585	59:52
North America	(United States) Greg Hingsbergen	5500	59:56
North America	(United States) Coby Dombrowski	5360	59:04
North America	(Canada) Colin Davidson	5060	60:00
North America	(United States) Joshua Bruce	4900	58:08
North America	(United States) Riley Flischel	4400	1:00:00
North America	(United States) Derek Kaplan	4200	55:16
North America	(United States) Brian Hanley	4170	56:12
North America	(United States) Matt Ficarra	4120	59:20
North America	(United States) Daniel Hart	4100	57:50
North America	(United States) David Nordstrom	4100	58:04
North America	(United States) Parker Garrison	4000	59:47
North America	(Canada) Johnny Valeriote	3950	1:00:00
North America	(United States) Norman Sheppard	3950	1:00:00
North America	(United States) Sean Dunbar	3950	1:00:00
North America	(Canada) Esther Vander Meulen	3935	1:00:00
North America	(United States) Ben deLeon	3850	56:42
North America	(United States) Andrew Heybruch	3850	1:00:00
North America	(United States) Robert Valentine	3825	57:35
North America	(United States) Jennifer Williams	3750	59:49
North America	(Canada) Keegan Morrissey	3750	59:53
North America	(United States) William OBrien	3750	1:00:00
North America	(United States) Josh Tucci	3700	1:00:00
North America	(United States) Helen Dupree	3650	58:59
North America	(United States) Jesi Lipp	3615	1:00:00
North America	(United States) Dan Seiders	3600	1:00:00
North America	(Canada) Diana Constantinescu	3530	1:00:00
North America	(United States) Jonathan Huang	3500	55:49
North America	(United States) Lianna Gerrish	3480	59:55
South/Latin America	(Colombia) Patrick Chatain	4200	59:29
South/Latin America	(Brazil) Washington Demicheli	4170	1:00:00
South/Latin America	(Argentina) Joaquin Courreges	3700	59:33
South/Latin America	(Argentina) Juan Pablo Brea	3700	59:44

==== Main draw (morning session) ====
The 128 players in the main draw bracket were divided into 8 groups of 16, with three of those groups playing at 8:00 AM BST to accommodate players from the Asia Pacific region. The remaining five groups played at 5:00 PM BST. The main draw brackets were only played for four rounds, with the final eight competitors automatically qualified for the in-person semi-finals at Las Vegas. The other 24 of the top 32 qualified to play in the game day competition one day before the finals.

Round 1 (Last 128) "30 Minute Mystery"
(Australia) (1) Andrew Ngai	1250
(United Kingdom) Francois Neethling	980
(Australia) Steve Schulz	864
(Australia) Tze Sheng Yeo	900
(Singapore) Min Min Chua	450
(Singapore) Kai Wei Lim	611
(United Kingdom) Edwin Brown	580
(Republic of Ireland) Jeroen Adriaanse	572
(Hungary) Marton Hunyady	926
(China) Zhang Yunyi	1090
(Germany) Jean Wolleh	1250
(Thailand) Bo Rydobon	1026
(India) Anup Agarwal	1130
(Ukraine) Samir Asadov	922
(United States) Nick Lowman	1250
(New Zealand) Nick Boberg	680

Round 2 (Last 64) "Perfect Date and Soulmate"
(Australia) (1) Andrew Ngai	940
(Australia) Tze Sheng Yeo	920
(Singapore) Kai Wei Lim	920
(United Kingdom) Edwin Brown	895
(China) Zhang Yunyi	972
(Germany) Jean Wolleh	1190
(India) Anup Agarwal	951
(United States) Nick Lowman	1130

Round 3 (Last 32) "Sleep as a Sport"
(Australia) (1) Andrew Ngai	1074
(Singapore) Kai Wei Lim	560
(Germany) Jean Wolleh	762
(United States) Nick Lowman	642

Round 4 (Last 16) "Mortal Wombat"
(Australia) (1) Andrew Ngai	1095
(Germany) Jean Wolleh	247

(Netherlands) Martijn Adriaanse	520
(France) Nicolas Micot	874
(France) Nicolas Micot	0
(Indonesia) Calvin Lim	960
(Philippines) Stevenson Yu	490
(India) Calvin Lim	650
(Indonesia) Calvin Lim	299
(China) Ben Gutscher	590
(United Kingdom) Arnold Miron	813
(Netherlands) Jasper van Merle	1205
(Netherlands) Jasper van Merle	1160
(China) Ben Gutscher	1190
(China) Ben Gutscher	1010
(Australia) Toby Funston	470
(China) Ben Gutscher	490
(Italy) Sergio Trifiletti	422
(India) Vikram Hattangady	746
Julien Lacaze	819
Julien Lacaze	998
(Madagascar) Christian Mbolanantenaina	1029
(Madagascar) Christian Mbolanantenaina	780
(Thailand) Pichaya Pan-anukooln	428
(Madagascar) Christian Mbolanantenaina	620
(Italy) Sergio Trifiletti	760
(Italy) Sergio Trifiletti	1180
(Singapore) Danny Whittaker	1070
(Italy) Sergio Trifiletti	1180
(Australia) (6) Matthew Fried	1028
(South Africa) Steyn Wolmarans	780
(Australia) (6) Matthew Fried	1250

(New Zealand) (7) Michael Clarke	676
(Australia) Robert Buemmer	460
(New Zealand) (7) Michael Clarke	1250
(Thailand) Pakkapong Sricharoen	1142
(New Zealand) Cheong Ng	846
(Thailand) Pakkapong Sricharoen	960
(New Zealand) (7) Michael Clarke	813
(Australia) Grayson Huynh	820
(Australia) Min Chen	1250
(New Zealand) Timothy Shue	1048
(Australia) Min Chen	1055
(Australia) Grayson Huynh	1220
(United Kingdom) Toby Julyan	498
(Australia) Grayson Huynh	920
(Australia) Grayson Huynh	615
(India) Prithviraj Mavani	597
(Philippines) Princess Camille Ong	850
(Poland) Jakub Pomykalski	880
(Poland) Jakub Pomykalski	1064
(India) Prithviraj Mavani	1146
(India) Prithviraj Mavani	1110
(New Zealand) Logan Clarke	816
(India) Prithviraj Mavani	442
(Hungary) Adam Reichenbach	0
(Hungary) Adam Reichenbach	975
(New Zealand) Cameron Fraser	780
(Hungary) Adam Reichenbach	1220
(Russia) Grigoriy Kirkishko	969
(Russia) Grigoriy Korkishko	580
(Madagascar) Cédric Morgan Rasolofo	DQ

==== Main draw (afternoon session) ====
Round 1 (Last 128) "Wabble"
(United States) Helen Dupree	570
(United States) Peter Scharl	1098
(Italy) Lorenzo Foti	824
(United States) Sean Dunbar	552
(United States) Josh Tucci	512
(Canada) Diana Constantinescu	430
(United States) Derek Kaplan	368
(United Kingdom) Hadyn Wiseman	608
(Brazil) Washington Demicheli	864
(Argentina) Juan Pablo Brea	558
(United States) Ben deLeon	842
(United States) Fritz Burkhardt	526
(France) Etienne Corget	416
(Spain) Eduardo Gonzalez Arias	566
(United States) Robert Valentine	574
(United States) (8) Jack Franken	1042

Round 2 (Last 64) "Portal"
(United States) Peter Scharl	1234
(Italy) Lorenzo Foti	1220
(United States) Josh Tucci	510
(United Kingdom) Hadyn Wiseman	952
(Brazil) Washington Demicheli	634
(United States) Ben deLeon	680
(Spain) Eduardo Gonzalez Arias	714
(United States) (8) Jack Franken	1050

Round 3 (Last 32) "Ironman"
(United States) Peter Scharl	843
(United Kingdom) Hadyn Wiseman	525
(United States) Ben deLeon	574
(United States) (8) Jack Franken	853

Round 4 (Last 16) "Volcano Island"
(United States) Peter Scharl	1110
(United States) (8) Jack Franken	1250

(United Kingdom) (5) Tim Roberts	626
(United States) David Brown	688
(United States) David Brown	513
(United Kingdom) Chris Clarke	1154
(Colombia) Patrick Chatain	638
(United Kingdom) Chris Clarke	898
(United Kingdom) Chris Clarke	620
(Chile) Juan Cifuentes	510
(Canada) Johnny Valeriote	672
(United States) Jacob Andrews	588
(Canada) Johnny Valeriote	474
(Chile) Juan Cifuentes	1250
(Chile) Juan Cifuentes	724
(Luxembourg) Yiwei Cao	646
(United Kingdom) Chris Clarke	1033
(United States) Sameer Jagetia	890
(Denmark) Anders Richter Lindén	880
(United States) Ben Carr	838
(Denmark) Anders Richter Lindén	850
(United States) Riley Flischel	660
(Canada) Esther Vander Meulen	260
(United States) Riley Flischel	578
(Denmark) Anders Richter Lindén	516
(United States) Sameer Jagetia	561
(United States) Colin Sheehe	810
(United States) Sameer Jagetia	836
(United States) Sameer Jagetia	696
(United States) Greg Hingsbergen	461
(United States) Daniel Hart	642
(United States) Greg Hingsbergen	710

(United States) William OBrien	418
(United States) Brittany Deaton	896
(United States) Brittany Deaton	1110
(United Kingdom) Ben Pridmore	613
(United Kingdom) Ben Pridmore	722
(United States) Jesi Lipp	448
(United States) Brittany Deaton	955
(Netherlands) Willem Gerritsen	955
(United States) Jeremy Freelove	612
(Netherlands) Willem Gerritsen	1042
(Netherlands) Willem Gerritsen	1026
(United Kingdom) Harry Gross	884
(United Kingdom) Harry Gross	904
(South Africa) Jason Webber	702
(United States) Brittany Deaton	1173
(United States) (4) Joseph Michael Palisoc	1050
(Netherlands) Martin Schaaphok	650
(United Kingdom) William Freestone	882
(United Kingdom) William Freestone	774
(United States) Coby Dombrowsky	1040
(United States) Coby Dombrowsky	938
(United States) Matt Stockton	563
(United States) Coby Dombrowsky	490
(United States) (4) Joseph Michael Palisoc	1250
(Denmark) Søren Nielsen	448
(United Kingdom) Tom Vincent	592
(United Kingdom) Tom Vincent	440
(United States) (4) Joseph Michael Palisoc	1000
(South Africa) Renier Wessels	652
(United States) (4) Joseph Michael Palisoc	748

(United Kingdom) (3) Michael Jarman	1048
(United States) Jonathan Huang	422
(United Kingdom) (3) Michael Jarman	1050
(United States) Alexander Freedman	764
(United States) Alexander Freedman	754
(United States) Brian Hanley	670
(United Kingdom) (3) Michael Jarman	0
(Hungary) Zsolt Mogyorósi	520
(United States) Parker Garrison	560
(Hungary) Zsolt Mogyorósi	662
(Hungary) Zsolt Mogyorósi	704
(United States) Matt Ficarra	656
(United States) Matt Ficarra	814
(United States) Jennifer Williams	504
(Hungary) Zsolt Mogyorósi	573
(Argentina) Joaquin Courreges	1220
(Austria) Benjamin Weber	692
(United States) Norman Sheppard	478
(Austria) Benjamin Weber	1180
(Canada) Adam Carter	1250
(Estonia) Siim Aksel Amer	512
(Canada) Adam Carter	1040
(Canada) Adam Carter	681
(Argentina) Joaquin Courreges	935
(Argentina) Joaquin Courreges	838
(Germany) Fanny Caillot	536
(Argentina) Joaquin Courreges	1242
(United States) David Nordstrom	461
(Greece) Thanasis Dogramatzidis	672
(United States) David Nordstrom	680

(United States) Lianna Gerrish	1114
(United Kingdom) Harry Watson	710
(United States) Lianna Gerrish	1114
(United States) Dan Seiders	854
(United States) Dan Seiders	854
(United Kingdom) Elliott Paterson	800
(United States) Lianna Gerrish	510
(United Kingdom) Chris Wilson	438
(United Kingdom) Karim Awenat	578
(United Kingdom) Chris Wilson	634
(United Kingdom) Chris Wilson	620
(United States) Andrew Heybruch	580
(United States) Andrew Heybruch	622
(United Kingdom) Paul Dent	602
(United States) Lianna Gerrish	1070
(Republic of Ireland) (2) Diarmuid Early	1060
(United States) Brian Wright	526
(United States) Joshua Bruce	812
(United States) Joshua Bruce	1050
(Canada) Keegan Morrissey	904
(United States) Eric Ashton	456
(Canada) Keegan Morrissey	614
(United States) Joshua Bruce	582
(Republic of Ireland) (2) Diarmuid Early	1001
(Canada) Michael Holmes	740
(Canada) Colin Davidson	608
(Canada) Michael Holmes	710
(Republic of Ireland) (2) Diarmuid Early	1250
(United States) Taylor Robinson	404
(Republic of Ireland) (2) Diarmuid Early	1140

==== Last chance qualification ====
The 2024 Microsoft Excel World Championship introduced the Last Chance Qualification Round (LCQR). The LCQR was open to anyone who did not advance to the Last 32 round at an additional cost. Entry for this event was also included for attendees of the concurrent The Active Cell event held in Las Vegas. The top 40 participants at this event who had not already qualified for the Game Day competition would join the 24 qualifiers from the main draw brackets for the Game Day competitions held one day before the live finals. The last 32 from the main draw bracket were also permitted to play, but as they had already qualified for the Game Day competition or live semi-finals, they would not take the 40 qualification spots from those not yet qualified.

The case for the Last Chance Qualification Round was called "Axel the Elf's Christmas Catastrophe!"

Last Chance Qualification Round
Player	Score	Time (mm:ss)
(Australia) Matthew Fried	1250	25:03
(United Kingdom) Harry Watson	1250	26:10
(United States) Daniel Hart	1250	26:33
(Austria) Benjamin Weber	1250	26:45
(United States) Helen Dupree	1170	30:00
(Canada) Martin Morissette	1140	30:00
(Colombia) Patrick Chatain	1090	29:42
(United States) Jeremy Freelove	1060	30:00
(United States) David Brown	1057	29:58
(United States) Eric Ashton	1007	29:46
(Poland) Jakub Pomykalski	960	30:00
(Australia) Phillip Harvey	950	30:00
(New Zealand) Timothy Shue	949	30:00
(New Zealand) Nick Boberg	930	30:00
(United States) Ben Carr	870	30:00
(United States) Jason Sindler	850	29:50
(Madagascar) Fifaliana Rafanomezantsoa	840	30:00
(United States) Grant Pitarys	790	30:00
(Germany) Julian Poeltl	780	30:00
(United States) Jacob Andrews	681	27:36
Julien Lacaze	664	27:09
(Brazil) Klinsmann Langhanz	642	25:34
(United States) Jackson Weber	640	29:38
(United States) Fritz Burkhardt	640	29:59
(Italy) Lorenzo Foti	621	29:19
(United States) Harry Seiders	621	29:44
(United States) Curtis Landry	581	30:00
(United States) Ben Northern	570	29:49
(United States) Ashleigh Roberts	570	30:00
(South Africa) Pieter Pienaar	541	29:33
(United States) Michele Perina	541	29:50
(Australia) James McQueen	541	29:53
(Argentina) Juan Pablo Brea	541	30:00
(Madagascar) Joy Andriamalala	540	30:00
(Mexico) Ricardo Alexis Domínguez Hernández	533	29:58
(United States) Beckett Anderson	530	28:59
(United States) Jacob Labkovski	530	29:43
(United States) Andrew Durant	530	29:58
(United States) Michael Koller	530	30:00
(United States) Luke Peyton	530	30:00
(France) Loic Roig	530	30:00
(United Kingdom) Elliott Paterson	530	30:00
(United States) Ray Medina	530	30:00

==== Game day competition ====
The game day competitions consisted of two rounds played by all 64 competitors who qualified either from the main draw bracket or the Last Chance Qualification Round. The scores from the two rounds were added together, and the top 16 participants would then move on to the live semi-finals.

Player	Case 1 "IsometriChaos"	Case 2 "Lana Goes Ice Skating"	Combined Score
(Republic of Ireland) Diarmuid Early	442	792	1234
(United States) Peter Scharl	579	608	1138
(United States) Jeremy Freelove	291	816	1107
(United States) Joshua Bruce	453	640	1093
(Chile) Juan Cifuentes	412	672	1084
(Germany) Jean Wolleh	588	488	1076
(United Kingdom) Michael Jarman	658	292	950
(United States) Eric Ashton	311	547	858
(Poland) Jakub Pomykalski	540	290	830
(Austria) Benjamin Weber	457	367	824
(United States) Coby Dombrowsky	380	436	816
(Hungary) Adam Reichenbach	449	357	806
(Italy) Lorenzo Foti	406	397	803
(New Zealand) Nick Boberg	459	343	802
(Denmark) Anders Richter Lindén	399	348	747

==== Live finals ====
In front of 400 spectators, Michael Jarman unseated three-time champion Andrew Ngai ("the Annihilator") in December 2024 in Las Vegas. Ngai was described as the Kobe Bryant of Excel, by contrast to Diarmuid Early, who was compared to LeBron James.

=== 2025 ===
The field size for the 2025 Microsoft Excel World Championship increased significantly, with spaces allowed for 256 competitors in the main draw. This includes qualified spots for:

- 90 places: 10 players in each of 9 monthly Road to Las Vegas battles. For each battle, this includes:
  - 1 place for the best livestreamed player,
  - 7 places for the best non-livestreamed players,
  - 1 place for the best U-25 non-livestreamed (online) player, and
  - 1 place for the best 50+ (known as the "Masters" category) non-livestreamed player.
- 16 places for the top-16 ranked Financial Modeling World Cup competitors, and
- 150 places for qualifiers who qualify through the qualification round held on September 27.

In addition, the organizers have implemented a seeding system, based on players' rankings in the Road to Las Vegas events. The top 5 rankings of the participants will be considered in the rankings, and the top 32 ranked players will be seeded in the main draw.

Diarmuid Early was named champion of the 2025 competition after beating 23 other players in the finals. Early won a themed championship belt and US$5,000 (£3,747) in prize money.

2025 Road to Las Vegas (RTLV) battles
RTLV Round	Player	Score	Time (mm:ss)	Qualification method
Excel Esports Battle I "We're Not In Kansas Anymore" January 23	(Republic of Ireland) Diarmuid Early	1181	29:27	Online
Excel Esports Battle I "We're Not In Kansas Anymore" January 23	(United States) Jack Franken	963	30:00	Online
Excel Esports Battle I "We're Not In Kansas Anymore" January 23	(United States) Peter Scharl	899	29:58	Online
Excel Esports Battle I "We're Not In Kansas Anymore" January 23	(Australia) Andrew Ngai	890	30:00	Online
Excel Esports Battle I "We're Not In Kansas Anymore" January 23	(United States) Coby Dombrowsky	821	30:00	Online
Excel Esports Battle I "We're Not In Kansas Anymore" January 23	(Netherlands) Willem Gerritsen	746	30:00	Online
Excel Esports Battle I "We're Not In Kansas Anymore" January 23	(Denmark) Anders Richter Lindén	731	30:00	Livestreamed
Excel Esports Battle I "We're Not In Kansas Anymore" January 23	(United States) Colin Sheehe	730	29:26	Online
Excel Esports Battle I "We're Not In Kansas Anymore" January 23	(United States) Tim Froelich	656	28:45	U-25
Excel Esports Battle I "We're Not In Kansas Anymore" January 23	(United States) Harry Seiders	586	29:43	Masters
Excel Esports Battle II "Whodunnit?" February 20	(Italy) Sergio Trifiletti	1186	29:59	Online
Excel Esports Battle II "Whodunnit?" February 20	(Austria) Benjamin Weber	1064	25:36	Online
Excel Esports Battle II "Whodunnit?" February 20	(United Kingdom) Chris Clarke	1056	27:51	Online
Excel Esports Battle II "Whodunnit?" February 20	(Philippines) Stevenson Yu	1048	29:00	Online
Excel Esports Battle II "Whodunnit?" February 20	(Thailand) Pakkapong Sricharoen	1048	30:00	Online
Excel Esports Battle II "Whodunnit?" February 20	Julien Lacaze	1040	25:56	Online
Excel Esports Battle II "Whodunnit?" February 20	(Canada) Michael Holmes	1040	28:10	Online
Excel Esports Battle II "Whodunnit?" February 20	(United Kingdom) Karim Awenat	1040	30:00	Masters
Excel Esports Battle II "Whodunnit?" February 20	(France) Nicolas Micot	998	30:00	Livestreamed
Excel Esports Battle II "Whodunnit?" February 20	(United States) Sean Dunbar	990	30:00	U-25
Excel Esports Battle III "I'm Just Wild About Harry" March 27	(New Zealand) Timothy Shue	811	30:00	Livestreamed
Excel Esports Battle III "I'm Just Wild About Harry" March 27	(Singapore) Danny Whittaker	760	27:15	Online
Excel Esports Battle III "I'm Just Wild About Harry" March 27	(United States) Sameer Jagetia	757	30:00	Online
Excel Esports Battle III "I'm Just Wild About Harry" March 27	(Germany) Jean Wolleh	754	27:21	Online
Excel Esports Battle III "I'm Just Wild About Harry" March 27	(United Kingdom) Michael Jarman	720	29:37	Online
Excel Esports Battle III "I'm Just Wild About Harry" March 27	(Chile) Juan Cifuentes	720	30:00	Online
Excel Esports Battle III "I'm Just Wild About Harry" March 27	(United Kingdom) Paul Dent	700	27:48	Online
Excel Esports Battle III "I'm Just Wild About Harry" March 27	(Colombia) Patrick Chatain	700	29:56	Online
Excel Esports Battle III "I'm Just Wild About Harry" March 27	(Australia) Ben Taylor	640	29:49	Masters
Excel Esports Battle III "I'm Just Wild About Harry" March 27	(Germany) Julian Poeltl	610	29:21	U-25
Excel Esports Battle IV "The Formula Bar and Grill" April 24	(China) Zhang Yunyi	1151	26:29	Online
Excel Esports Battle IV "The Formula Bar and Grill" April 24	(New Zealand) Nick Boberg	1071	29:44	Online
Excel Esports Battle IV "The Formula Bar and Grill" April 24	(United Kingdom) Elliott Paterson	1070	29:23	Online
Excel Esports Battle IV "The Formula Bar and Grill" April 24	(United States) Kenny Worrell	1070	29:48	Online
Excel Esports Battle IV "The Formula Bar and Grill" April 24	(United States) Fritz Burkhardt	1070	30:00	Online
Excel Esports Battle IV "The Formula Bar and Grill" April 24	(Italy) Diego Sala	1069	28:01	Online
Excel Esports Battle IV "The Formula Bar and Grill" April 24	(Australia) Grayson Huynh	1061	26:03	Online
Excel Esports Battle IV "The Formula Bar and Grill" April 24	(Germany) Tim Gabriel Töpper	889	24:29	U-25
Excel Esports Battle IV "The Formula Bar and Grill" April 24	(Canada) James Thai	747	30:00	Masters
Excel Esports Battle IV "The Formula Bar and Grill" April 24	(India) Anup Agarwal	736	30:00	Livestreamed
Excel Esports Battle V "Bit of Music" May 29	(Italy) Lorenzo Foti	1180	25:09	Online
Excel Esports Battle V "Bit of Music" May 29	(United States) Jeremy Freelove	1180	26:12	Online
Excel Esports Battle V "Bit of Music" May 29	(Canada) Adam Carter	1180	28:01	Online
Excel Esports Battle V "Bit of Music" May 29	(United States) Eric Ashton	1123	29:46	Online
Excel Esports Battle V "Bit of Music" May 29	(China) Ben Gutscher	1120	28:32	Online
Excel Esports Battle V "Bit of Music" May 29	(United States) Alexander Freedman	1090	29:44	Online
Excel Esports Battle V "Bit of Music" May 29	(Madagascar) Jonathan Razanamparany	1090	30:00	Online
Excel Esports Battle V "Bit of Music" May 29	(United States) Helen Dupree	980	30:00	U-25
Excel Esports Battle V "Bit of Music" May 29	(Poland) Jakub Pomykalski	934	30:00	Livestreamed
Excel Esports Battle V "Bit of Music" May 29	(United States) Jason Sindler	800	30:00	Masters

== Other events ==
FMWC also holds other events (typically Excel esports battles). Some events have granted automatic qualification to the MEWC playoff rounds. Some events are livestreamed and can be viewed by the public. These events include (but are not limited to):

Date	Event name	Winner	Nation	Case name
8 June 2021	888 Battle	Michael Jarman	Canada	Cake To Bake
9 September 2021	Battle of 16	Diarmuid Early	United States	N/A (Multiple)
17 February 2022	Global Excel Summit 2022	Jason Webber	South Africa	Ludo
18 February 2022	Global Excel Summit 2022	David Brown	United States	Square of Fortune
31 March 2022	Continent Battle: Asia / Pacific	Nick Boberg	New Zealand	Minesweeper
24 May 2022	All-Star Battle	Andrew Ngai	Australia	N/A (Multiple)
30 June 2022	Women's Battle	Stephanie Annerose	United States	Lottery
28 July 2022	Continent Battle: Africa	Gareth Watson	South Africa	Tug of War
25 August 2022	Continent Battle: Europe	Willem Gerritsen	Netherlands	It's a Sequence
23 February 2023	Global Excel Summit 2023	Jason Webber	South Africa	A Story About the Reels
