= Model audit =

Trial financial report

A model audit is the colloquial term for the tasks performed when conducting due diligence on a financial model, in order to eliminate spreadsheet error. Model audits are sometimes referred to as model reviews, primarily to avoid confusion with financial audit. A study in 1998 concluded that even MBA students with over 250 hours of spreadsheet development experience had a 24% chance of introducing spreadsheet error.

Model audits are typically requested by banking organizations, in order to reassure lenders and investors alike that the calculations and assumptions within the model are correct, and that the results produced by the model can be relied upon. When a comprehensive review of the model is required, the scope of review is often extended to include tax and accounting, sensitivity testing and the checking of data contained within the model back to the original financing and legal documentation.

== Purpose ==
The purpose of a model audit is to provide assurance that the results can be relied upon. For this reason, the party conducting the review will provide a level of reliance on the form of an amount of liability. This may range from a multiple of the fee (2×, 3×, 4× fee, etc.) to a fixed amount, often up to US$20 million. In the event an error or omission is found in the model due to the model auditor's negligence, the organization relying on the report may choose to sue the model auditor in order to recover any loss.

The objective of the model audit should be to the reduce financial risk that is being taken on by under the transaction to which the financial model relates. As such, it is more important to ensure that the model audit has the proper scope, and is undertaken using a robust methodology, to identify material errors than to negotiate a liability cap if material errors are not identified. The model audit is not, or at least not as a primary purpose, an insurance policy, it is for reducing the financial risk that is being taken on.

== Typical scope ==
For a full-scope model audit, the following elements would usually be included:

- A review of the model's logic;
- A review of the model's consistency with financial and contractual documentation;
- A review of the model's consistency with relevant accounting and tax requirements;
- A sensitivity review.

== Application ==
Model audit has predominately been related to project finance and infrastructure finance, including Public–private partnership ("PPP") transactions (including PFI in the UK and P3 in the USA).

Model audits are applicable to any financial model that is used to support the taking on of any financial risk, e.g. valuation models, operational models, refinancing models, portfolio model, M&A models etc.

== How it is conducted ==
Most financial models are produced using spreadsheet software. The model will routinely contain sheets for input data, formulas (the 'workings') which drive the model, and outputs, which are usually in the form of financial statements (balance sheet, income statement, cash flow statement, etc.).

Model auditors may undertake a detailed 'bottom-up' review (cell-by-cell checks) of each unique formula, and/or combine a 'top-down' analysis such as the performance of calculations based upon the project's documentation

There is some debate as to whether a "cell-by-cell" or performance approach is most appropriate. A model auditor may emphasize one or the other or use a combination of both approaches.

== Competitive dialogue for PPPs ==
Procurement of public–private partnership projects is often undertaken under a competitive dialogue regime. This requires bidders to commit earlier in the process, and the implication of not identifying errors in a financial model at any early stage could be that a bidder is unable to rectify the error.

As a result, financial models are being checked earlier in the bid process, not just at financial close – these are known as pre-preferred bidder reviews. In some cases, these will have almost the same scope as a financial close model audit (but with documentation review limited as this will still be being drafted), but in other cases, the pre-preferred bidder review will be limited to an agreed scope of procedures with the objective of maximizing risk mitigation whilst minimizing the fee. The benefits of a pre-preferred bidder review is that it should lead to a reduced model audit fee at financial close.

The introduction of this process to North America has been controversial. In Canada, the City of Brampton, for instance, has faced lawsuits and controversy about use of the process.

== Cost and duration ==
A model audit may take between 1 and 5 weeks, but this does not include the time taken by the model author to rectify the errors identified by the model auditor. The fee is largely dependent upon the scope of review, the number and complexity of the unique formulae in the model, the volume and complexity of the documentation and the number of versions of the model/documentation to be reviewed. The cost will also depend on the seniority of staff undertaking the work.
