= Wilmott (magazine) =

- Editor: Paul Wilmott
- Categories: Business magazine
- Frequency: 6 times a year
- Circulation: c. 2,000
- Publisher: Wiley Publishing
- Founded: 1999
- Company: Wiley Publishing and Paul Wilmott
- Country: United Kingdom
- Based in: London
- Language: English
- Website: wilmott.com

Wilmott Magazine is a mathematical finance and risk management magazine, combining technical articles with humor pieces. Each copy of Wilmott is 11 inches square, runs about 100 pages, and is printed on glossy paper. The magazine has the highest subscription price of any magazine.

== Content and contributors ==
Wilmott has a section with technical articles on mathematical finance, but includes quantitative financial comic strips, and lighter articles.

Wilmott magazine's regular contributors include Edward Thorp, Espen Gaarder Haug, Aaron Brown, William Ziemba, Nassim Taleb, Henriette Prast, Kent Osband, Satyajit Das, Babak Mahdavi-Damghani, Pat Hagan, Dave Ingram, Elie Ayache, Milford Radley, Jean-Philippe Bouchaud and Jan Darasz.

== History ==
The magazine was launched in 1999 in London. The publishers are Wiley Publishing and editor in chief Paul Wilmott. The magazine's target audience is people working with quantitative finance in hedge fund, investment banks, risk management and professional investment management firms.
