= James Kinlay =

Scottish journalist and assistant editor

James Kinlay (17 October 1926 – 8 June 2010) was a Scottish journalist and assistant editor of the Sunday Express, where for thirty years he was the right-hand man of the late editor in chief John Junor.

As features editor he worked with celebrated cartoonists Carl Giles and Michael Cummings and interviewed many of the leading political figures of the day, including Reginald Maudling, Alec Douglas-Home and Harold Wilson.
Born in Glasgow, he studied classics at Glasgow University before emigrating with his new wife, Elizabeth, to Kenya in the early 1950s to begin his career in journalism on the Nairobi Times. His five children include hedge fund manager Jonathan Kinlay and the actress Antonia Kinlay is one of five grandchildren.
