= Microsoft Excel Collegiate Challenge =

Esports competition

The Microsoft Excel Collegiate Challenge (MECC) is a Microsoft Excel esports competition.

== Background ==
The MECC started in 2022 and combines elements of the Financial Modeling World Cup and the Microsoft Excel World Championship, targeting college students. Contestants solve problems, in the form of case studies, using the spreadsheet software. Competitors are ranked through multiple rounds of timed competition, including an in-person final round. Participants may compete in either individuals or teams. The competition is jointly organized by the Eller College of Management and Financial Modeling World Cup.

In each round, competitors solve problems presented as one-to-five-page-long financial modeling case studies with questions at the end, using Microsoft Excel.

== 2022 edition ==
=== Competition Details and Format Changes ===
2,730 students from 93 countries and 596 universities and colleges registered for the 2022 MECC. The total prize pool was $30,000 USD. Competitors could sign up individually, or in teams of up to 3 athletes.

The MECC began with two preliminary rounds, taking place online in October 2022. Competitors were allotted two hours to complete each round. Both rounds featured three FMWC style cases. The cases for the 2nd preliminary round were equivalent to those for Stage 7 of the FMWC competition.

Invites to the final day were distributed in the following manner:

- 30 individual competitors with the highest combined scores of the preliminary rounds
- Five teams with the highest combined scores of the preliminary rounds
- Five schools with the highest number of MECC signups

The final day took place on December 3, at the University of Arizona . The final day started with two semifinal rounds. The top eight individual competitors and top four teams advanced to the final rounds.

The final rounds were held in the University of Arizona Esports Arena and consisted entirely of Microsoft Excel World Cup style cases. It was livestreamed on FMWC's YouTube channel, and ESPNU later aired a condensed version on December 18.

=== Results ===
==== Individual ====
===== Finals - Round 2 =====
Rank	Athlete	Nation	University	Score	Prize
1st place, gold medalist(s)	Isaac Lee	Singapore	National University of Singapore	381	$10,000
2nd place, silver medalist(s)	Gavin Hartzell	United States	The Ohio State University	216	$5,000
3rd place, bronze medalist(s)	Forrest Liu	United States	University of Pennsylvania	205	$2,500
4	Andrew Cheng	United States	New York University	176	$1,250

===== Finals - Round 1 =====
Rank	Athlete	Nation	University	Score	Prize
1	Forrest Liu	United States	University of Pennsylvania	1,014	
2	Isaac Lee	Singapore	National University of Singapore	1,000	
3	Gavin Hartzell	United States	The Ohio State University	836	
4	Andrew Cheng	United States	New York University	775	
5	Patrick Chatain	Canada	McGill University	760	$750
6	Danendra Lohanata	Singapore	Nanyang Technological University	724	
7	Nitish Mehta	Canada	Ivey Business School	722	
8	Morgan Carr	United States	Middle Georgia State University	617	

===== Semifinals =====
Rank	Athlete	Nation	University	Round 1	Round 2	Score
1	Patrick Chatain	Canada	McGill University	640	670	1310
2	Isaac Lee	Singapore	National University of Singapore	510	710	1220
3	Andrew Cheng	United States	New York University	690	485	1175
4	Gavin Hartzell	United States	The Ohio State University	659	430	1089
5	Forrest Liu	United States	University of Pennsylvania	720	286	1006
6	Morgan Carr	United States	Middle Georgia State University	550	454	1004
7	Danendra Lohanata	Singapore	Nanyang Technological University	540	429	969
8	Nitish Mehta	Canada	Ivey Business School	570	392	962
9	Suman Acharya	United States	Maharishi International University	589	304	893
10	Athanasios Dogramatzidis	Greece	University of Athens	410	430	840
11	Leslie Cannell	Canada	Fanshawe College	342	442	784
12	Pieter Pienaar	South Africa	University of Pretoria	310	465	775
13	Venkat Ravi	United States	Duke University	405	295	700
14	Prarthana Magon	United States	University of Arizona	345	350	695
15	Samuel Henley	Australia	Curtin University	345	340	685
16	April Grossi	United States	UNC Kenan-Flagler Business School	307	377	684
17	Antonio Gorgijovski	Australia	Macquarie University	130	480	610
18	Tyler Street	Canada	University of Waterloo	235	365	600
19	Matthé Hulshof	Netherlands	Avans University of Applied Sciences	294	305	599
20	William Montgomery	United States	Arizona State University	375	212	587
21	Chirayyu Jain	United States	Babson College	228	275	503
22	Nicole Rong	United States	University of Pennsylvania	298	193	491
23	Hayden Boccardo	United States	University of Arizona	150	335	485
-	Ankit Kumar	India	IIM Bodh Gaya	—N/a (DNS)		
-	Samarth Anand	India	Delhi University	—N/a (DNS)		
-	Aditya Kumar Darak	India	Gujarat University	—N/a (DNS)		

==== Team ====
===== Finals =====
Rank	Nation	Athletes	University	Score	Prize
1st place, gold medalist(s)	United States	Roshni Chandawarkar; Manny Mehta; Austin Towle	The Ohio State University	558	$6,000
2nd place, silver medalist(s)	Madagascar	Kiraën Andriamandimbisoa; Tafitantsoa Rakotondrafara; Ny Tsiory Nomentsoa Rakotonanahary	INSCAE	420	$3,000
3rd place, bronze medalist(s)	United States	Garima Gupta; Pranjal Bhatt; Thomas Ewing	University of Texas at Dallas	328	$1,500
4	United States	Samuel Primack; Brandon Jung; Benhamin Cherdak	University of Arizona	204	

===== Semifinals =====
Rank	Nation	Athletes	University	Case 1	Case 2	Total Score
1	Madagascar	Kiraën Andriamandimbisoa; Tafitantsoa Rakotondrafara; Ny Tsiory Nomentsoa Rakotonanahary	INSCAE	710	485	1195
2	United States	Roshni Chandawarkar; Manny Mehta; Austin Towle	The Ohio State University	345	610	955
3	United States	Samuel Primack; Brandon Jung; Benhamin Cherdak	University of Arizona	385	465	850
4	United States	Garima Gupta; Pranjal Bhatt; Thomas Ewing	University of Texas at Dallas	262	442	704
5	United States	Tammy Brewer; Rowen Fletcher; Kate Martin	University of Arizona	269	410	679
6	United States	Akshay Kolte; Maria Toledano; Florian Mehl	Babson College	336	267	603
7	United States	Kayla Oxley; Krishang Agarwal; Divyansh Gour	Indiana University Bloomington	228	305	533
-	Kenya	Saeed Shaffiq; Michasel Muiruri	Strathmore University	—N/a (DNS)		
-	Pakistan	Maarij Haroon; Swaleh Ahmed	NED	—N/a (DNS)		

== 2023 edition ==
=== Competition Details and Format Changes ===
Team sign up is no longer available to all students. In order to compete as a team, students must be enrolled in a partner school. Partner Schools have coordinated with the FMWC organizers to be named as a partner school and receive an automatic bid for one team (up to three people) to compete in-person on the final day

Invites to the final day will be distributed in the following manner:

- 20 individual competitors with the highest combined scores of the preliminary rounds
- One team for each partner school

=== Results ===
==== Qualification Round ====
Rank	Athlete	Nation	University	Round 1	Round 2	Score
1	Benjamin Weber	Austria	University of Applied Sciences Technikum Wien	1360	765	2125
2	Tim Froelich	United States	Indiana University Bloomington	1230	855	2085
3	Gavin Hartzell	United States	The Ohio State University	1110	825	1935
4	Zefanie Gayle Tan	Philippines	Ateneo de Manila University	1140	705	1845
5	Antonio Gorgijovski	Australia	Macquarie University	1090	650	1740
6	Patrick Chatain	Canada	McGill University	1080	610	1690
7	Jonathan Razanamparany	Madagascar	INSCAE	1080	530	1610
7	Samuel Hanley	Australia	Curtin University	840	770	1610
9	Julian Poeltl	Germany	Hochschule Reutlingen	780	800	1580
10	Giorgi Goderzishvili	Georgia	Free University of Tbilisi	850	690	1540
