= Kinlay Group =

Irish tourism company

The Kinlay Group
- Type: Private limited company
- Industry: Travel; Tourism; Hospitality
- Predecessor: Usit Ireland Limited
- Founded: October 30, 1972; 54 years ago
- Founder: Union of Students of Ireland Travel
- Defunct: July 18, 2023
- Fate: Dissolved
- Headquarters: Dublin, Ireland
- Area served: Ireland; United Kingdom
- Owner: Michael Tunney; David Andrews; Neil O'Leary
- Parent: Kinlay Group Limited

The Kinlay Group was a travel, tourism, and hospitality company. It operated in Ireland and the United Kingdom. The company went out of business in 2020 and a petition for liquidation was made on 27 March 2020.

== History ==
The company's origins lie in Union of Students of Ireland Travel, a service of the Union of Students of Ireland (USI) serving as a travel desk for students. It was registered as a company on 30 October 1972 as Usit Limited. From 13 October 1972 to 17 November 1989 the company was renamed Usit Ireland Limited. Since 17 November 1989 it was registered as Kinlay Group Limited, headquartered at 19-21 Aston Quay in Dublin. USI sold its stake in the company for £9,000,000 in 2000; by this time, the company had established branches in more than 20 countries around the world, with the Irish wing being known as USIT NOW.

The company suffered economically following the September 11 attacks and was bought out of examinership in 2002 by Neil O’Leary, Michael Tunney, and David Andrews. O'Leary sold his part of the company to Tunney and Andrews in 2019.

The group operated the following brands: including:

- Darkey Kelly
- Eurotrain
- Harding Hotel
- Irish Studies Summer School
- Kinlay House
- Kinlay House - the Five Star Hostel
- Maynooth Travel
- The Real Experience Group
- The Travel Company
- Travel Options
- Trinity College Summer School
- Trinity Summer School
- Usit
- Usit Accommodation Centres
- Usit Now
- Usit Student Travel
- Utravel
- Waterford Travel

The Usit group was composed of: Dublin Usit Ireland Limited, the principal trading company; School and Group Tours Limited; and Dublin College of Business Studies Limited.

In March 2020 provisional liquidators were appointed to four companies in the USIT travel group after the COVID-19 crisis caused their collapse.

In April 2020 the High Court confirmed the appointment of liquidators to companies in the USIT travel group.
