= Return on modeling effort =

Financial and engineering term

Return on modelling effort (ROME) is the benefit resulting from a (supplementary) effort to create and / or improve a model.

== Purpose ==
In engineering, modelling always serves a particular goal. For example, the lightning protection of aircraft can be modelled as an electrical circuit, in order to predict whether the protection will still work in 30 years, given the ageing of its electrical components. More and more effort can be put in making this model predict reality perfectly. However, this perfection comes at a price: researchers invest time and money in improving the model. As a Return on investment (ROI), the ROME is a metric for the use of further modelling. It may therefore serve as a 'stopping criterion'.

Typically, researchers will pull towards continuing modelling, while management will pull towards stopping modelling. Being explicit about the cost and benefits of continued modeling may help to make informed decisions that are understood by both sides. Continuous communication between model developers and model users increases the probability of models being actually put to profit.

== Domains ==
ROME is a metric, which can be evaluated wherever modelling is performed with a quantifiable goal. Examples include:

- Modeling the impact of federal policy on social problems.
- Modeling a marketing mix to statistically correlate a number of inputs (or independent variables) – such as a marketing campaign – to outcomes (or dependent variables) – such as sales or profits.
- Modeling the links between enterprise actors to make an informed choice on splitting organizations.
- Modeling the coupling of an electromagnetic interference to a PCB to reduce its susceptibility by improving the routing of traces.

== Research ==
The initiative "Models at Work" studies the creation, management and use of domain models in scientific and industrial practice, aiming at a diversity of goals, varying from (as truthful as possible) representation of the conceptual structure of the domain that is modelled, via animation, simulation, execution and gamification, until automated (logic-based) reasoning.
