= Paul Wilmott =

British quantitative analyst (born 1959)

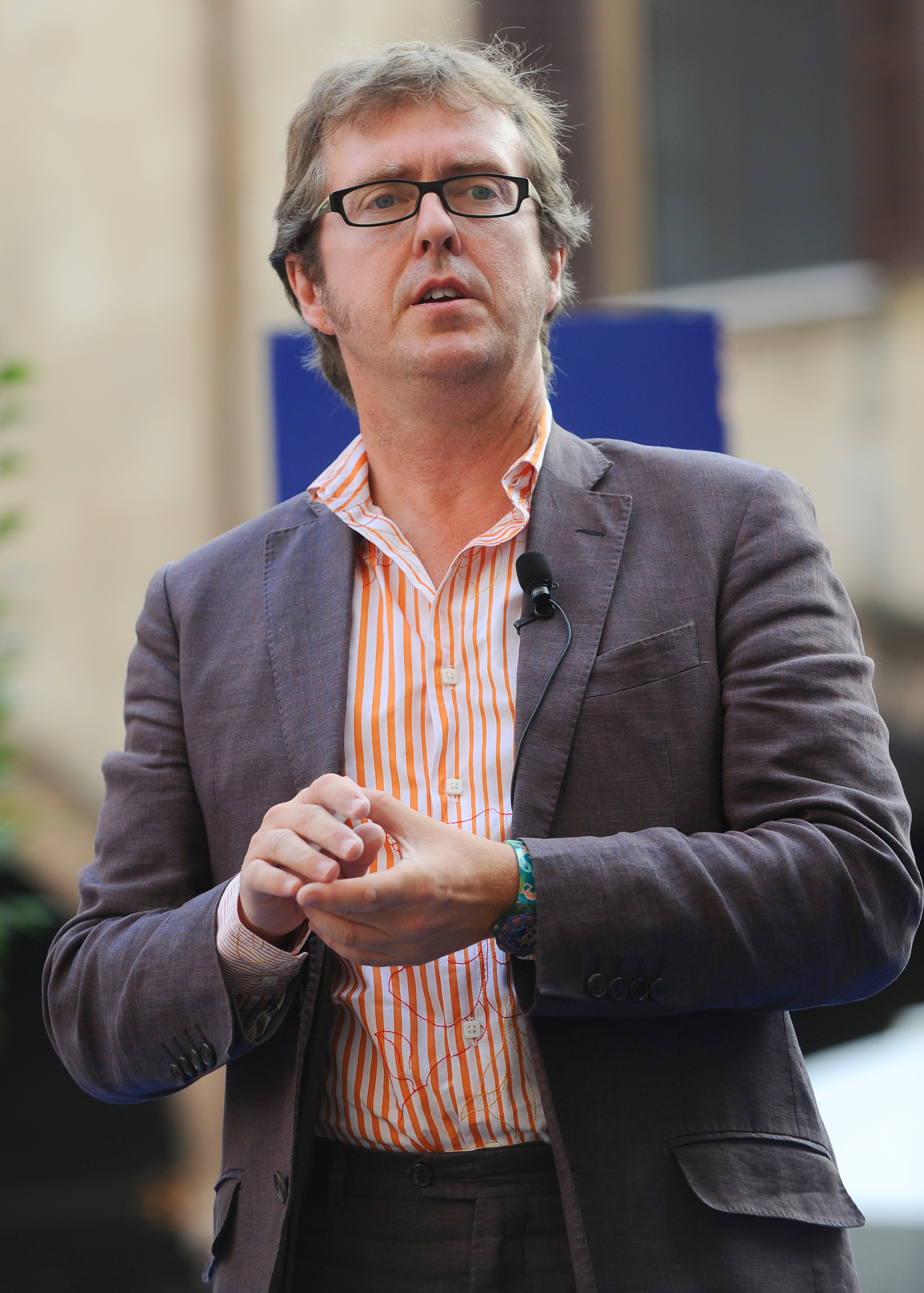
- Paul Wilmott in 2012
- Born: 8 November 1959 (age 66); Birkenhead
- Education: St Catherine's College, Oxford (DPhil, 1985)
- Occupations: researcher; consultant; lecturer; quantitative analyst
- Known for: Wilmott wilmott.com

Paul Wilmott (born 8 November 1959) is an English researcher, consultant and lecturer in quantitative finance. He is best known as the author of various academic and practitioner texts on risk and derivatives, for Wilmott magazine and Wilmott.com, a quantitative finance portal, and for his prescient warnings about the misuse of mathematics in finance.

== Early life ==
One of two sons of an accountant and an entrepreneurial mother, Wilmott attended Wirral Grammar School for Boys in Bebington, and read mathematics at St Catherine's College, Oxford. He stayed on to get a DPhil in fluid mechanics in 1985.

== Career ==
After working on mathematical modelling for various industries, Wilmott learned of the potential uses of mathematics in quantitative finance from a friend, and decided to become a consultant in the subject. He is currently the co-owner and Course Director for the Certificate in Quantitative Finance, a half-year distance learning course on mathematical finance at Fitch Learning, a London-based company providing training for the financial services industry. He is a director of Wilmott Electronic Media, which manages Wilmott.com, a website for the quantitative analyst community; and is a director of Paul & Dominic Quant Recruitment. He was a founding partner of Caissa Capital, a volatility arbitrage hedge fund, since closed; founded the Diploma in Mathematical Finance at Oxford University; and established the journal Applied Mathematical Finance.

== Criticism of misuse of financial mathematics ==
Wilmott is a vocal and long-standing critic of the use of mathematical models in finance by quants. In a paper published by the Royal Society in 2000, he stated that "It is clear that a major rethink is desperately required if the world is to avoid a mathematician-led market meltdown… The underlying assumptions in the models, such as the importance of the normal distribution, the elimination of risk, measurable correlations, etc., are incorrect".

In 2008, he expressed his frustration in the lack of progress made in adopting more appropriate models: "I don't like the assumptions, the models, the implications… Banks and hedge funds employ mathematicians with no financial-market experience to build models that no one is testing scientifically for use in situations where they were not intended by traders who don’t understand them. And people are surprised by the losses!"

Writing during the 2008 financial crisis, he stated: "I predict that things are going to get even worse".

Reflecting his concerns, in 2009 Wilmott and fellow quant Emanuel Derman co-authored the Financial Modelers' Manifesto, which lays out a series of principles for more responsibility in risk management and quantitative finance

== Criticism of funding for political parties ==
In 2015, Paul posed as a potential donor to the United Kingdom Conservative, Labour and Liberal Democrat parties in order to expose wrongdoing in the election. He suggested he was willing to donate £50,000 to each party. In the course of the investigation he met all three party leaders, met four cabinet ministers and two shadow cabinet ministers.

== Publications ==
In addition to research papers on quantitative finance, Wilmott has authored several textbooks, including:

- The Mathematics of Finance for High Schoolers (Panda Ohana 2023)
- The Mathematics of Artificial Intelligence for High Schoolers (Panda Ohana 2023)
- Machine Learning: An Applied Mathematics Introduction (Panda Ohana 2019)
- Frequently Asked Questions in Quantitative Finance (Wiley 2007, 2009)
- Paul Wilmott Introduces Quantitative Finance (Wiley 2007)
- Paul Wilmott On Quantitative Finance (Wiley 2006)
- With J.N.Dewynne and S.D.Howison, Mathematics of Financial Derivatives: a Student Introduction (Cambridge University Press 1995)

== See also ==
- Financial engineering
- Mathematical finance
