= Format =

Format may refer to:

== Printing and visual media ==
- Text formatting, the typesetting of text elements
- Paper formats, or paper size standards
- Newspaper format, the size of the paper page

== Computing ==
- File format, particular way that information is encoded for storage in a computer file
  - Document file format, for storing documents on a storage media, especially for use by computer
  - Audio file format, for storing digital audio data on a computer system
  - Video file format, for storing digital video data on a computer system
- Content format, encoded format for converting a specific type of data to displayable information
- Disk formatting, preparing computer hard disks to store data, destroying any existing contents
  - FORMAT (command), a command-line utility to format disks in many computer operating systems
- Format (Common Lisp), a programming function for formatting printed output
- Format (Fortran 66), a programming statement for formatting printed output
- Format (Algol68), a programming function and type for formatting printed output

== Arts and entertainment ==
- Film format, standard characteristics regarding image capture on photographic film
- Format (photographic agency), agency set up in 1983 to represent women photographers
- Playoff format, type of competition in sports and games to determine an overall champion
- Radio format, the overall content broadcast on a radio station
- TV format, overall concept, premise and branding of a television program

== Music ==
- Format (album), a compilation album of B-sides and bonus tracks released February 2012 by Pet Shop Boys
- The Format, a musical group
- The Format (album), by AZ
- DJ Format, a hip-hop artist

== See also ==
- Form (disambiguation)
- Style (disambiguation)
