= Antonia Kinlay =

- Occupation: Actress

Antonia Kinlay is a British / American actress and voiceover artist. She is a graduate of the Royal Academy of Dramatic Art

Her TV credits include playing Sarah Shadlock in Strike for BBC / HBO and 'The Royals' for E!

She played Revlon in The Revlon Girl at the Park Theatre which went on to be nominated for an Olivier Award for Outstanding Achievement at an Affiliate Theatre. In the West End, Kinlay has played Melody in Michael Longhurst's production of "Bad Jews" at the Theatre Royal Haymarket and Penny in "Three Lions" at the St James Theatre. In 2016 she appeared in "The Suicide" at the National Theatre and played the title role in "Lady Anna: All at Sea" at the Park Theatre Kinlay has worked with director Blanche McIntyre at the Trafalgar Studios in Christopher Hampton's translation of "When Did You Last See My Mother". She played Helena in the Lucinda Coxon play The Eternal Not at the National Theatre which was later made into a short film.

Other television credits include ITV's Emmerdale, the BBC television drama Consuming Passion: 100 Years of Mills & Boon (as Lorelei) Doctors (as Amanda Billington) and the American TV movie Broadside. Kinlay was in the short film "Touch" which won the Grand Prize at the Virgin Media Shorts Awards in 2013.
