= Cliff Asness =

American hedge fund manager

Clifford Asness
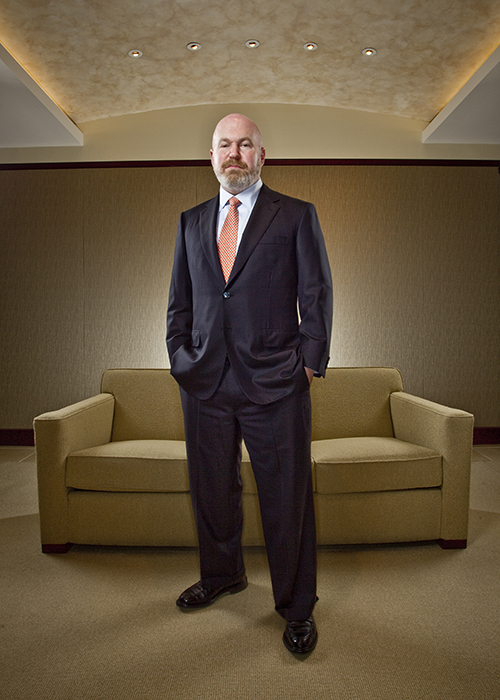
- Asness in 2010
- Born: October 17, 1966 (age 60); New York City, New York, USA
- Education: University of Pennsylvania (BS); University of Chicago (MBA, PhD)
- Occupation: Hedge fund manager
- Employer: AQR Capital Management
- Spouse: Laurel Elizabeth Fraser (m. 1999)
- Children: 4

Clifford Scott Asness (/ˈæznəs/; born October 17, 1966) is an American hedge fund manager and the co-founder of AQR Capital Management. As of September 2026, Forbes estimated his net worth at US$8 billion.

== Early life and education ==
Asness was born to a Jewish family in Queens, New York, the son of Carol, who ran a medical education firm, and Barry Asness, an assistant district attorney in Manhattan who was a former Golden Gloves boxer. His family moved to Roslyn Heights, New York, when he was four. He attended the B'nai B'rith Perlman Camp, and graduated from the public Herricks High School in New Hyde Park, New York.

In 1988, Asness graduated summa cum laude from the University of Pennsylvania, from which he received a bachelor's degree with a double major in electrical engineering and economics as part of the Jerome Fisher Program in Management and Technology (M&T). Asness's interest in finance and portfolio management began while he worked as a research assistant in the Finance Department at Wharton, where he learned to use "coding computer programs" to analyze markets" and "test economic and financial theories".

In 1989, Asness enrolled at the University of Chicago Booth School of Business, where he received an MBA with high honors in 1991 and a PhD in finance in 1994. At Chicago, Asness was the teaching assistant (TA) for his dissertation adviser, Nobel laureate Eugene Fama — who was also Asness' mentor — and the economist, Kenneth French, who were both influential and widely respected empirical financial economists, had established the foundations of their Fama–French three-factor model in 1992. (Note: The Fama–French three-factor model expanded the Capital Asset Pricing Model (CAPM) by adding risk factors—size and value.) Fama and French had contrasted value stocks with growth stocks. Since Fama and French's inception of value stocks, "quants have designed algorithms that can scour market data" looking for "factors".

Asness' doctoral dissertation was on "the performance of momentum trading, buying stocks with rising prices". Asness asserted that profits consistently beating market averages were attainable by exploiting both value and momentum. Asness concept of value was referred to in the context of fundamental analysis as a way of assessing the true worth of a security. His use of the concept of momentum referred to betting that the value will continue to go up or down as it did in the recent past. While he did not originate these concepts, Asness was credited with being the first to compile enough empirical evidence across a wide variety of markets to bring the ideas into the academic financial mainstream.

== Career ==
=== Global Alpha ===
Asness started his career in 1990, when he was 24 and still a PhD student. In the early 1990s, he had left academia, to the regret of his mentor, to become manager of Goldman Sachs Asset Management's (GSAM) "new quantitative research desk." He invited two friends from his cohort at the University of Chicago to join him at GSAM. Together, they began "developing models to evaluate risk in currencies, bonds and entire economies." While the "idea of factors" came from Fama and French, it was first "put into practice" in the late 1990s by Asness, according to The Economist. Asness and his team at GSAM built on Fama and French's idea of factors, and combined their work with insights he had gained from his own PhD research. Asness worked as GSAM manager until 1997, when he and some members of the GSAM team left to start their own quantitative hedge fund.

In 1995, Asness persuaded a few partners at Goldman to provide him with an initial US$10-million investment to employ the computer-driven models that his team had developed, to invest in the market.

When the $10 million initial investment reached $100 million, Goldman opened the fund to the public—the Goldman Sachs Global Alpha Fund. Global Alpha, a systematic trading hedge fund was one of the earliest "quant vehicles" in the industry. The fund became known for high-frequency trading and furthered the careers of Asness and Mark Carhart. Asness and his team used complicated computerized trading models to first locate underpriced equities, bonds, currencies, and commodities and then use short selling to take advantage of upward or downward price momentum. The fund was designed to make money regardless of the direction the market was moving. The Wall Street Journal described Asness and Carhart as "gurus" who managed Global Alpha, a "big, secretive hedge fund"—the "Cadillac of a fleet of alternative investments" that had made millions for Goldman Sachs by 2006. By 2007, at its height, Global Alpha was "one of the biggest and best performing hedge funds in the world" with more than $12 billion assets under management (AUM). Global Alpha was shut down in the fall of 2011. The quant fund had declined significantly by mid-2008, and continued its decline to $1 billion AUM through 2011.

=== AQR Capital Management ===
In 1998, Asness, David Kabiller, John Liew, and Robert Krail, co-founded Applied Quantitative Research (AQR) Capital Management, a "quantitative hedge fund firm." In 2002, Asness's compensation was $37 million, and in 2003, $50 million. In 2004, AQR moved its headquarters from New York to Greenwich, Connecticut.

AQR reported losses during the 2008 financial crisis; however, by the end of 2010, AQR had $33 billion in assets under management (AUM). An October 2010 Bloomberg article described AQR as a "quantitative investment firm" that used "algorithms and computerized models to trade stocks, bonds, currencies and commodities."

In 2016, Connecticut's State Bond Commission extended $35 million in financial aid to AQR, as part of a "broader move by the Connecticut government to persuade companies", including hedge fund Bridgewater Associates, to remain in Connecticut. AQR's $28 million loan would be forgiven if AQR kept "540 jobs within Connecticut" and created 600 new jobs by 2016. AQR received grants worth $7 million to "help pay for an expansion."

By 2017, according to Forbes, Asness had "moved away from hedge funds" and aggressively promoted lower-fees, more "liquid and transparent products", such as "mutual funds, that use computer models, often to replicate hedge fund returns".

By 2019, AQR had become an "investment firm"—running "one of the world's largest hedge funds". A 2020 Forbes profile described AQR (Applied Quantitative Research) as an agency that employs "factor-based investing," and offers products ranging from hedge funds to mutual funds.

In 2023, Asness, Stable Asset Management, and other institutional investors in the aggregate made commitments of several hundred million dollars in the newly launched Niche Plus multimanager hedge fund, the first fund of ClearAlpha Technologies. The fund is co-run by founding partners AQR alumnus Brian Hurst and former Goldman Sachs chief information officer Elisha Wiesel. The fund will focus on niche strategies, including temperature arbitrage.

== Selected academic publications ==
In a co-authored 2001 article published in the Journal of Portfolio Management, the authors described how, while some hedge fund managers are skilled in picking stocks, not all use effective methods. In their 2003 publication in the Financial Analysts Journal, Arnott and Asness wrote that contrary to prevailing theory, companies that paid higher dividends, actually had higher growth in earnings. They found that low payout ratios "preceded low earnings growth." In a 2003 Journal of Portfolio Management article, Asness said that it was a mistake to compare stock market's P/E ratio—earnings yield—to interest rates (called the Fed model).

In a 2013 co-authored article published in The Journal of Finance, Asness, Tobias Moskowitz, and Lasse Pedersen found "consistent value and momentum return premia across eight diverse markets and asset classes, and a strong common factor structure among their returns." Since this strategy for accumulation is subject to the same constraints as any other and systemic effects in markets can invalidate it: AQR and other similar ventures lost massive amounts of wealth in the 2008 financial crisis with assets declining from $39 billion in 2007 to $17 billion by the end of 2008. (Note: According to Systemic Risk and Systematic Value, "Value investment means buying (or overweighing) securities that rank high on conventional valuation scales, such as book-price ratios or forward earnings yields. Momentum trading means 'going long' securities that have outperformed in the recent past.")

== Publications about Asness ==
The New York Times published a profile of Asness on June 5, 2005. The Times said that "what Asness really does is try to understand the relationship between risk and reward."

Asness was featured in Scott Patterson's 2010 publication, The Quants, along with Aaron Brown from AQR Capital Management, Ken Griffin from Chicago's Citadel LLC, James Simons from Renaissance Technologies, and Boaz Weinstein from Deutsche Bank. a "scourge of bad practices in the money management industry" with the "intellectual chops to back up his attacks". Patterson said that Asness was known as "one of the smartest investors in the world." He had been a "standout student at the University of Chicago's prestigious economics department in the early 1990s, then a star at Goldman Sachs in the mid-1990s before branching out on his own in 1998 to launch AQR with $1 billion and change, a near record at the time."

== Economic and political commentary ==
Asness frequently comments on financial issues in print and on CNBC and other television programs. He has frequently spoken out against high hedge fund fees. In particular, he has been critical of hedge funds with high correlations to equity markets, delivering stock index fund performance (which is available cheaply) at prices that could only be justified by extraordinary market insight that only the best hedge funds seem to deliver consistently.

In 2008, he complained about short-selling restrictions in The New York Times. In a 2010 The Wall Street Journal op-ed (written with Aaron Brown) he claimed the Dodd-Frank financial reform bill would lead to regulatory capture, crony capitalism and a massive "financial-regulatory complex." In Bloomberg columns, he discussed taxation of investment managers and healthcare reform. He posts commentary on financial issues, generally from a libertarian and efficient markets viewpoint.

In an unpublished 2000 paper, "Bubble Logic," Asness criticized "nonsensical" and "unsustainable stock prices" that caused the stock market tech bubble of 1999–2000. In a special 60th anniversary edition of The Financial Analysts Journal he said that this was also the fifth anniversary of the stock bubble peak, he repeated his criticisms the tech bubble and those who claimed options should not be expensed.

He was also known as an outspoken critic of U.S. president Barack Obama. Two tracts he authored protest the Obama administration's treatment of Chrysler senior bondholders.

In 2012, he was included in the 50 Most Influential list of Bloomberg Markets magazine.

In 2013, Asness was a signatory to an amicus curiae brief submitted to the U.S. Supreme Court in support of same-sex marriage during the Hollingsworth v. Perry case.

In 2023, Asness declared he would no longer donate to his alma mater University of Pennsylvania due to their hosting the Palestine Writes festival, and what he called a "drift away from true freedom of thought, expression and speech."

== Personal life ==
In 1999, Asness married Laurel Elizabeth Fraser of Seward, Nebraska, the daughter of a retired Methodist pastor. Asness has four children.

He sold his Miami Beach penthouse for $22 million in July 2020, after purchasing it from businessman Boris Jordan in May 2018.

== See also ==
- Fed model
