= Aaron Brown (financial author) =

American financial analyst

Aaron C. Brown (born November 27, 1956) is an American finance practitioner, well known as an author on risk management and gambling-related issues. He also speaks frequently at professional and academic conferences. He was Chief Risk Manager at AQR Capital Management. He was one of the original developers of value at risk and one of its strongest proponents.

== Biography ==
Brown was born in Seattle, Washington. In college and graduate school he was a professional poker player and traded securities for his own account.

In 1982, Brown moved to New York and worked as a portfolio manager (Prudential Financial), trader and head of Mortgage Securities (Lepercq, de Neuflize), risk manager (JPMorgan Chase, Rabobank, Citigroup, Morgan Stanley and AQR Capital Management) and lectured at Fordham and Yeshiva universities.

Brown was named Risk Manager of the Year at the Global Association of Risk Professionals' annual convention in 2012. He was voted Financial Educator of the Year by the readers of Wilmott Magazine and his website received several Forbes Best of the Web awards for Theory and Practice of Investing.

Brown holds an SB in applied mathematics from Harvard University (1978), and an MBA in finance and statistics from the University of Chicago (1984).

== Works ==
Brown is the author of Financial Risk Management for Dummies, Red-Blooded Risk: The Secret History of Wall Street, The Poker Face of Wall Street and A World of Chance (with Reuven and Gabrielle Brenner).

He has also written for Wilmott Magazine and Quantum Magazine; he is a frequent contributor to the professional literature.

The Poker Face of Wall Street was selected one of the ten best business books of 2006 by Business Week.

== See also ==
- Scott Patterson's The Quants: How a New Breed of Math Whizzes Conquered Wall Street and Nearly Destroyed It (Crown Business, 2010) contains extensive accounts of Aaron Brown's career.
