= Quant =

Quant may refer to:

== Finance ==
- A financial jargon term for:
  - Quantitative analyst, someone who applies mathematical techniques to financial investment
  - Quantitative fund, an investment fund managed by use of numerical methods
  - Quantitative investing, investing using such techniques

== People with the name ==
- Mary Quant (1930-2023), British fashion designer and icon
- Quant (surname), with list of name-holders

== Other uses ==
- The Quants, a book by Scott Paterson about quantitative funds that use quantitative analysts
- Quant (automobile), a series of prototype electric cars produced by the Swiss company nanoFlowcell
- Quant pole, used to propel a barge

== See also ==
- Quantum (disambiguation)
- Quants (disambiguation)
- Qwant, a European internet search engine which claims not to track users
