= David Kabiller =

American tennis player and investor

David G. Kabiller
- Born: July 2, 1963 (age 62); Chicago, Illinois, U.S.
- Occupation: investor
- Known for: Co-founder of AQR Capital Management
- Children: 1 son

David G. Kabiller (born July 2, 1963) is the founder, founding principal, and head of business development of AQR Capital Management, along with Cliff Asness, John M. Liew and Robert Krail. He initiated AQR's international growth and its introduction of mutual funds as well as the creation of the AQR University symposia series and the AQR Insight Award for outstanding innovation in applied academic research. Kabiller established AQR's QUANTA Academy program, which is designed to help employees reach their full potential. The program offers a holistic approach, focusing on both professional and personal development.

== Early life and education ==
Kabiller was born July 2, 1963, in Chicago, Illinois, to a Jewish family, the son of Elaine (née Tunick; 1934-2022) and Irving Kabiller (1930–2012). He has one sister, Sari Kabiller Battista. He earned a B.A. in economics from Northwestern University, where he received an athletic scholarship to play tennis and was named to the Big Ten's Academic All-Conference team, and an M.B.A. from Northwestern's Kellogg School of Management.

== Career ==
After school, he worked as a vice president at Goldman, Sachs & Co.

Kabiller has co-authored papers on topics including derivatives, enhanced indexation, securities lending, insurance-linked securities, hedge funds and the secret of Warren Buffett's investing acumen. “Buffett’s Alpha” received the 2018 Graham and Dodd Award from the Financial Analysts Journal for the year's best paper. He was profiled in Scott Patterson's book The Quants.

== Philanthropy ==
He is a member of the Northwestern University Board of Trustees and large donor to both academic and athletic scholarship programs. He is a member of the Advisory Council of the AQR Asset Management Institute at London Business School and also serves on the board of trustees for the Terra Foundation for American Art. He is chairman of the Executive Council of the International Institute for Nanotechnology and endowed the biennial $250,000 Kabiller Prize in Nanoscience and Nanomedicine and $10,000 Kabiller Young Investigator Award in Nanoscience and Nanomedicine. He created the David G. Kabiller NU for Life Program, which provides mentoring and career development for Northwestern University athletes. In recognition of David's multimillion-dollar gift to endow the program, it was named in his honor in 2019. In 2017, London Business School honored David with an Honorary Fellowship for his service to the school and distinction in business. In 2021, Kabiller endowed the Kabiller Science of Empathy Prize at Northwestern University's Kellogg School of Management, which biennially is awarded to a member of the Kellogg faculty who "has conducted novel research that advances analytical and rigorous critical thinking about human empathy, understanding and trust." In 2023, Kabiller helped conceive the Longevity Transitions Salon series at Stanford University's Center on Longevity, which was funded by a gift from the Kabiller family. Kabiller also serves as a trustee for Riverdale Country School.
