= Quants =

Quants may refer to:

- Quants Reserve, a nature reserve in Somerset, England
- Quantitative analysts
- The Quants, a 2010 book by Scott Paterson

== See also ==
- Quant (disambiguation)
