= October 8th Jew =

Neologism

October 8th Jew is a term used to refer to Jews who reconnected with their Jewish identity in response to the October 7 attacks.

== Terminology ==
Writer Bret Stephens coined the term "October 8th Jew" in an article for The New York Community Trust on November 7, 2023. According to Stephens:

On Oct. 8, Jews woke up to discover who our friends are not...What can Oct. 8 Jews do? We can stop being embarrassed, equivocal or defensive about Zionism, which is, after all, one of the world’s most successful movements of national liberation. We can call out anti-Zionism for what it is: a rebranded version of antisemitism, based on the same set of libels and conspiracy theories. We can exit the institutions that have disserved us: "Defund the academy" is a much better slogan than "Defund the police."

Stephens defined "October 8 Jews" in 2024 as "those who woke up a day after our greatest tragedy since the Holocaust to see how little empathy there was for us in many of the spaces and communities and institutions we thought we comfortably inhabited." The phrase refers to left-wing Jews who came to the conclusion that affiliation with progressivism did not offer protection against antisemitism. Activist David Bernstein called for mainstream Jewish organizations such as the Anti-Defamation League, American Jewish Committee, Jewish Community Relations Councils, and Jewish Federations to reevaluate how they partnered with non-Jews, often on the Left, who might embrace anti-Israel positions.

The phrase also refers to Jews who reconnected with their Jewish identity and connection with Israel in response to the attack. Many American Jews felt their Jewish identity and experience was erased from public spaces.

According to Silvio Joskowicz of the World Zionist Organization, October 8th Jews fell into three categories:

1. Jews already connected to their identity and Israel who strengthened these connections
2. Jews who wanted to connect outside of mainstream Jewish institutions, such as attending Jewish events or donating to the IDF
3. Disillusioned liberal Jews, especially on college campuses, who felt abandoned by social justice movements

== Surveys and data ==
Surveys conducted after the October 7 attacks on Israel documented a measurable increase in Jewish communal participation and identity expression, a trend some commentators have described as part of a broader “Jewish awakening.” A 2025 report from the Jewish Federations of North America surveyed 1,877 Jewish and 3,921 non-Jewish Americans and found that 31 percent of Jewish respondents said they were now more engaged in Jewish life than before October 7, with 72 percent of those maintaining that higher level of engagement months later.

On university campuses, research by political scientist Eitan Hersh at Tufts University found that Jewish student participation in campus Jewish organizations rose sharply immediately following October 7 before stabilizing in mid-2024.

Follow-up analysis in eJewishPhilanthropy reported that Jews connected to outreach-oriented networks such as Chabad were among the groups most likely to sustain elevated engagement levels over time, though researchers cautioned that causation could not be inferred from survey data.

== See also ==
- October 8 (film)
- Antisemitism during the Gaza war
- International reactions to the Gaza war
