= University donors during the Gaza war =

After the October 7 attacks, donors to colleges and universities in the United States halted donations or cut ties with the schools over their responses to the attacks and the resulting antisemitism on campuses. The reaction has been called a donor backlash, a donor revolt, a donor crisis, and a donor uprising.

== Background ==
At colleges and universities in the United States, private donors give to specific purposes, often sit on universities' boards of trustees, and can fill funding gaps. According to Indiana University's Lilly Family School of Philanthropy, educational institutions are second only to religious institutions as the largest recipient of donations in the United States. At Harvard University, for example, philanthropy is the single largest contributor of revenue, accounting for 45% of the university's income.

== Events ==
=== Protests ===
Pro-Palestinian protests on university campuses escalated from April 2024 until the summer, spreading in the United States and other countries, as part of wider Gaza war protests. The escalation, nicknamed by activists the "student intifada", began on April 18 after mass arrests at the Columbia University campus occupation, led by anti-Zionist groups, in which protesters demanded the university's disinvestment from Israel over the Gaza genocide. Over 3,100 protesters were arrested in the U.S., including faculty members and professors, on over 60 campuses. Protests spread across Europe in May with mass arrests in the Netherlands, 20 encampments established in the United Kingdom, and across universities in Australia and Canada.

The different protests' varying demands included severing financial ties with Israel, transparency about financial ties, ending partnerships with Israeli institutions, and amnesty for protesters. Universities suspended and expelled student protesters, in some cases evicting them from campus housing. Many universities relied on police to forcibly disband encampments and end occupations of buildings, several made agreements with protesters for encampments to be dismantled, (Note: Universities that came to agreements with protesters over certain demands, in order for encampments to be dismantled, included Northwestern University, Brown University, Evergreen State College, University of Minnesota, Rutgers University, Goldsmiths, University of London, University of California, Riverside, Thompson Rivers University, University of California, Berkeley, Harvard University, and the University of Sydney.) and others cut ties with Israeli institutions or companies involved with Israel and its occupied territories. (Note: Universities that cut or paused ties with Israeli institutions – or companies involved with Israel and its occupied territories – include Portland State University, Trinity College Dublin, the University of Helsinki, the University of Copenhagen, Ghent University, the University of Waterloo, San Francisco State University , Massachusetts Institute of Technology, and the Institut d'études politiques de Strasbourg.) The campus occupations also resulted in the closure of Columbia University, Cal Poly Humboldt, and the University of Amsterdam; rolling strikes by academic workers on campuses in California, and the cancellation of some U.S. university graduation ceremonies.

Hundreds of groups expressed support for the protests, and the police response in the U.S. was criticised. Supporters of Israel and some Jewish students raised concerns about antisemitic incidents at or around the protests, prompting condemnations of the protests by international leaders. Students and faculty members who participated in the protests, many of whom are Jewish, said the protests were not antisemitic. In May 2024, it was estimated that 8% of U.S. college students had participated in the protests, with 45% supporting them and 24% opposed. 97% of the protests remained nonviolent and 28–40% of Americans supported the protests with 42–47% opposed. (Note: Range is based on the following two polls: YouGov, 47% of Americans opposed the campus protests and 28% supported them; Data for Progress poll in collaboration with Zeteo, 40% approved, while 42% disapproved of the protests.) The protests were compared to the anti-Vietnam and 1968 protests, politically criticized by a wide range of mainstream U.S. Republican and Democratic politicians, and frequently counter-protested by Zionist and right-wing organizations.

Major donors announced they would cut their ties and withhold donations to the schools in protest of the colleges' responses.

After the escalation of pro-Palestinian encampments and occupations on college campuses in April 2024, at which there were concerns about antisemitism, safety of Jewish students, and violence, additional donors announced disassociations with colleges and universities and the cessation of donations.

=== Harvard University ===
At Harvard University, a coalition of student groups released an anti-Israel statement blaming Israel for the attacks on October 8. Three days later did Harvard address the matter directly, with a statement from then-president Claudine Gay that drew criticism from Jewish and Israeli students for not acknowledging the October 7 attacks.

On October 13, philanthropist Idan Ofer stepped down from the executive board of the Harvard Kennedy School, citing "lack of clear evidence of support from the University's leadership for the people of Israel following the tragic events of the past week, coupled with their apparent unwillingness to recognize Hamas for what it is, a terrorist organization."

On October 16, the Wexner Foundation cut ties with Harvard, citing the "dismal failure of Harvard's leadership to take a clear and unequivocal stand against the barbaric murders of innocent Israeli civilians by terrorists."

In December 2023, Len Blavatnik halted donations to Harvard after controversial testimony by President Gay at the 2023 United States Congress hearing on antisemitism and antisemitism at Harvard after the October 7 attacks. Blavatnik had donated at least $270 million to the school.

=== University of Pennsylvania ===
In September 2023, the University of Pennsylvania (UPenn) hosted the controversial Palestine Writes Literary Festival, prompting more than 4,000 people, including prominent donors, to sign an open letter to university president Liz Magill, saying that "platforming of outright antisemitism without denunciation from the university is unacceptable." In the days after the October 7 attacks in 2023, donors such as Mark Rowan, CEO of Apollo Global Management, called the university's response insufficient, demanded that Magill and Bok step down, and called for other alumni to "close their checkbooks" until their resignations. In 2018, Rowan donated $50 million to the Wharton School, considered the largest donation the school had ever received, and he chaired Wharton's board of advisors. Rowan became a key influential voice encouraging wealthy donors to withhold donations to schools.

After hearing Rowan's criticism of UPenn, investor Steve Eisman asked UPenn to remove his family's name from a scholarship, telling officials that "he does not want my family's name associated with the University of Pennsylvania, ever." Eisman was also frustrated by UPenn's response to Palestine Writes.

On October 15, Jon Huntsman Jr. announced that his family foundation would stop donating to UPenn, writing to Magill that, "Moral relativism has fueled the university's race to the bottom and sadly now has reached a point where remaining impartial is no longer an option." Huntsman previously served on Upenn's board of trustees. Jon Huntsman Sr. had donated at least $50 million to the Wharton School as of 2014.

Also on October 15, investor and computer scientist David Magerman announced he was withdrawing his grants to the school over the school's handling of the situation.

After Magill's controversial appearance during a U.S. Congressional hearing on antisemitism in December 2023, in which she avoided questions about how students calling for the genocide of Jews would be punished, hedge fund CEO Ross Stevens rescinded a planned $100 million donation to the school.

=== Columbia University ===
On October 27, hedge fund manager Leon Cooperman said he would no longer donate to Columbia University after donating over $50 million in previous years, amid the rise of antisemitism at the school.

In April 2024, Robert Kraft announced that he was "not comfortable" supporting Columbia University until actions were taken to end the encampments on campus. Kraft had donated at least $8.5 million to the university since 2000.

That same month, the Russell Berrie Foundation announced it was suspending its giving to Columbia over the university's lack of response to "create a tolerant and secure environment for Jewish members of the Columbia community." The foundation had donated more than $85 million to the university.

In January 2025, Avi Kaner, owner of Morton Williams, redirected his donations from the president of Columbia's discretionary fund to the university's Institute for Israel and Jewish Studies. Kaner had made annual gifts to Columbia for 30 years.

== Reactions ==
U.S. Senate Majority Leader Mitch McConnell praised Rowan on the Senate floor, noting that Rowan's call to boycott the school had spread like wildfire, precipitating a crisis that by one account could put a billion-dollar hole in the university's books.

== Impact ==
=== Financial impact ===
According to Lee Gardner of the Chronicle of Higher Education in October 2023, the financial impact on schools such as Harvard and UPenn would likely be felt in the long-term, on gifts and donations that would come to fruition over years. Smaller private schools and state flagship schools would be impacted if the donor backlash spread from the Ivy League. Sara Harberson, a former associate dean of admissions at UPenn, said that big donors cutting ties could convince smaller donors to end their contributions, hurt alumni relations, and put pressure on the university president or board of trustees.

In November 2023, Harvard gift officers expressed their fear in the Harvard Crimson that long-time donors would stop giving as a result of the controversy over the university's response to the Israel-Hamas war and concerns about antisemitism on campus. Gifts to Harvard dropped 15% during the 2024 fiscal year, the biggest decrease in donations in 8 years.

Columbia University's Gift Day on October 2, 2024, its first since the October 7 attacks, raised 29% less in gifts compared to 2022 and was the first year that total monetary donations had declined since the first Gifting Day in 2012.

The Penn Fund at the University of Pennsylvania raised less money from fewer donors in 2024 than any year since 2020, with donations down 21% compared to the previous year.

=== Reallocation ===
Several donors redirected their giving to Israeli universities or Jewish causes. Two months after cutting financial ties with Columbia University, Robert Kraft directed a $1 million donation to Yeshiva University in June 2024 to fund a program for students seeking to transfer to the Jewish university. That month, an anonymous Columbia University graduate donated $260 million to Bar-Ilan University in Israel. David Magerman redirected $5 million intended for UPenn to five Israeli universities in October, including Jerusalem College of Technology, Tel Aviv University, Technion, and Bar-Ilan University, to create degree tracks in English.

== Foreign donations ==
Donations from foreign entities and individuals came under increasing attention after the October 7 attacks, due to concerns that the money was fueling antisemitism and anti-Israel sentiment on college campuses. In 2025, the U.S. House passed the DETERRENT Act, requiring universities to report foreign donations above $50,000, down from $250,000 under current law, and to disclose any donations from so-called countries of concern, including Iran and Saudi Arabia.

== See also ==
- 2023 United States Congress hearing on antisemitism
- Universities and antisemitism
