= T3 Live =

American online financial media network

T3 Live, LLC
- Type: Subsidiary
- Industry: Training
- Founded: 2007; 19 years ago
- Headquarters: New York City, United States
- Key people: Sean Hendelman (CEO)
- Products: Financial trading education
- Parent: T3 Trading
- Website: www.t3live.com

T3 Live is an American financial media network and educational platform that provides traders with market analysis, access to strategies and training. It was founded in 2007.

== History ==
T3 Live was founded in 2007 as part of a remote training program for Nexis Capital. Nexis Capital wanted to provide greater educational opportunities for young and aspiring traders.

It is under the umbrella of T3 Companies, marketed as representing one of the three pillars of the T3 philosophy: training, trading, and technology. The company now focuses on a number of multimedia publications and interactive educational resources related to technical analysis and active trading.

== Products and services ==
T3 Live produces a number of free videos and articles on current events and market conditions which are published daily on the firm's website. Many of the articles and videos are syndicated to other large financial publications such as Minyanville, The Wall Street Journal, and Bloomberg.

Two of the most popular videos are The Morning Call and The Daily Recap, produced by Scott Redler in collaboration with thestreet.com. The Morning Call gives an update on the day's headlines prior to the opening bell and suggests a number of stocks and positions to watch during the day's trading. The Daily Recap reviews the action from the trading day and identifies the winners and losers and recommends technical positions to watch.

T3 Live now offers a number of different courses and educational resources for traders as well. The media content and the course materials are presented by some of the firm's leading traders.

=== Virtual Trading Floor ===
The Virtual Trading Floor is a dynamic online trading community. Subscribers can listen to audio from professional traders, view actual positions that update in real-time, and interact with the T3 Live community with the trader chat feature. Traders explain their positions on key stocks as they make them.

=== Courses ===
T3 Live offers three distinct training courses on three different types of trading: active trading, swing trading, and momentum trading. Each course introduces the basic concepts and foundations of a different trading strategy. Each course also has an associated trader mentorship program with one of T3's professional traders.

== In the media ==
T3 Live has been featured in large media outlets including: CNBC, Investor's Business Daily, The Wall Street Journal, and Fox Business, and its publications have been syndicated in most large financial publications such as MarketWatch and The Wall Street Journal.

Scott Redler, the Chief Strategic Officer of T3 Trading Group, has become a frequent contributor and commentator on CNBC and The Wall Street Journal. In particular, he has made a number of appearances on Jim Cramer's show Mad Money.

During the Facebook IPO, The Wall Street Journal also recognised some of T3 traders' strategies for trading the IPO on its first day.
