= Todd Harrison =

American business executive

- Occupations: Founder and CEO of Minyanville

Todd Harrison is the founder and former CEO of the Emmy Award-winning internet media company Minyanville.

== Biography ==
=== Wall Street Career ===
Todd Harrison optioned out of a two-decade ascent toward the upper echelons of Wall Street leadership to found Minyanville, a website dedicated to financial education and related projects, such as the Ruby Peck Foundation for Children's Education which supports learning through creative education.

Harrison finished as vice president after a seven-year stint (1992–1998) on the worldwide equity derivative desk at Morgan Stanley, went on to become Managing Director of Derivatives at The Galleon Group, and completed his Wall Street career as President of the $400 million hedge fund, Cramer Berkowitz, and writer for TheStreet.com. He became CEO of the Minyanville internet media company founded in 2003.

The Other Side of Wall Street: In Business it Pays to Be an Animal, In Life It Pays to Be Yourself (2011: FT Press) was written by Harrison to relate the story of how and why he left a lucrative career in trading and finance to create a company dedicated to informing both Wall Street professionals and the general public about the complexities, trends and harsh realities of the stock market.

Harrison has appeared on Fox, CNBC, CNN, Bloomberg TV and in The Wall Street Journal, BusinessWeek, The New York Times, Worth, Fortune, Barron's, Dow Jones MarketWatch, New York and Canada's National Post, and contributed articles to various market-related publications.

Numerous academic institutions, such as Harvard University, Syracuse University, New York University, and the Wharton School of the University of Pennsylvania, have hosted Harrison's lectures and presentations. He was featured in the 20th anniversary documentary of Oliver Stone's Wall Street.

In 2008 Harrison received an Emmy Award from The National Academy of Television Arts & Sciences for serving as executive producer of Minyanville's World In Review, television's first animated business news show.

=== Minyanville & Ruby Peck Foundation ===
Minyanville Media, Inc. has four business lines; dot.com properties include Minyanville, which produces and curates original content that is syndicated throughout the web, including Yahoo Finance, MSN Money, and AOL Money and Finance. MV Professional Products licenses content to enterprise partners and provides a suite of subscription products for consumers. Minyanville Studios produces original content, both for its flagship website and for third-party enterprise clients. MV Gaming consists of a massive multi-player online game. Minyanland.com is geared toward the financial education of 8- to 12-year-old children.

Since its inception, the Ruby Peck Foundation for Children's Education has provided grants to support projects such as Junior Achievement of New York's entrepreneurial education program, New York's Children's Aid Society and music programs sponsored by the organization Little Kids Rock. The Ruby Peck Foundation raises money through individual and corporate donations, and its annual "Festivus" party, a combination Wall Street get-together, holiday party and rock concert, held annually in December.

=== CB1 Capital ===
Harrison founded CB1 Capital in 2017. CB1 Capital is a long-short healthcare hedge fund that intends to invest in the universe of stocks and industries that focus on cannabinoid-based solutions and other cannabis-based bio-pharmaceutical applications and therapies.
