= International Institute for Nanotechnology =

International Institute for Nanotechnology (IIN)
- Type: Research institute
- Established: 2000
- Parent institution: Northwestern University
- Director: Chad Mirkin
- Faculty: >240
- Location: Evanston, Illinois, United States
- Website: www.iinano.org

The International Institute for Nanotechnology (IIN) was established by Northwestern University in 2000. It was the first institute of its kind in the United States and is one of the premier nanoscience research centers in the world. Today, the IIN represents and unites more than $1 billion in nanotechnology research, educational programs, and supporting infrastructure.

IIN faculty includes 20 members of the National Academy of Sciences, the National Academy of Engineering, and the Institute of Medicine. One of Northwestern University's largest collaborative efforts, IIN brings together more than 240 chemists, engineers, biologists, physicians, and business experts, to focus on society's most perplexing problems. But the IIN's influence extends far beyond Northwestern's campus. It has developed collaborative partnerships with academic institutions in 30 countries, as well as with more than a dozen U.S. federal agencies and 100 countries.

Since its inception, more than 2,000 products and systems have been commercialized worldwide. Twenty-three start-up companies have been launched based upon IIN research, and they have attracted over $1 billion in venture capital funding. The IIN is changing the face of research in fields from medical diagnostics to materials science. The IIN drives innovation-based business formation, employment and economic growth.

The role of the institute is to support meaningful efforts in nanotechnology, house state-of-the-art nanomaterials characterization facilities, and nucleate individual and group efforts aimed at addressing and solving key problems in nanotechnology. The IIN positions Northwestern University and its partners in academia, industry, and national labs as leaders in this unique field.

== Research Areas ==
Research is organized into the following eight pillars, each focused on a critical societal issue:

- NanoMedicine
- NanoOncology
- Molecular Electronics
- NanoEnabled Energy Solutions
- Environmental Nanotechnology
- NanoEnabled Solutions for Food and Water
- Nanotechnology for Security and Defense
- NanoEducation

== Northwestern Faculty Members Involved with IIN ==
IIN faculty are drawn from 32 departments and four schools at Northwestern:

- Molecular biosciences
- Chemistry
- Neurobiology
- Physics and astronomy
- Cellular and molecular biology
- Obstetrics and gynecology
- Pediatrics
- Radiology
- Urology
- Civil and environmental engineering
- Mechanical engineering
- Medical Humanities and bioethics
- Medicine
- Cardiology
- Dermatology
- Endocrinology
- Neurological surgery
- Physiology
- Radiation oncology
- Biomedical engineering
- Electrical engineering and computer science
- Hematology and oncology
- Infectious diseases
- Pulmonary and critical care
- Molecular pharmacology and biological chemistry
- Neurology
- Pathology
- Preventative medicine
- Surgery
- Chemical and biological engineering
- Materials science and engineering
- Kellogg School of Management, Levy Entrepreneurial Institute

== Executive Council ==
The IIN Executive Council is a group of business people, led by David Kabiller, committed to advocating for nanotechnology research and education; promoting the IIN as a high-impact philanthropic opportunity; and advising IIN leadership on philanthropy, marketing, and bringing technology from the laboratory to market.

== Kabiller Prize ==
Nanomedicine is an emerging field that focuses on using nanotechnology to impact the field of medicine. New ways of studying, diagnosing, and treating diseases have been the dividends of basic research in the field of nanoscience. Indeed, this field and the devices that derive from it could make great impacts on the field of medicine.

Through a generous donation from entrepreneur David Kabiller, the IIN established the $250,000 Kabiller Prize in Nanoscience and Nanomedicine and the $10,000 Kabiller Young Investigator Award in Nanoscience and Nanomedicine. Every other year, the Kabiller Prize recognizes individuals who have made a career-long, significant impact in the field of nanotechnology applied to medicine and biology. The Kabiller Young Investigator Award recognizes individuals who have made breaking discoveries within the last few years in the same area that have the potential to make a lasting impact.

== Education ==
The IIN seeks to develop and nurture the scientists, engineers, technicians, and teachers of tomorrow; enrich the academic environment; and inform and engage the public through the following programs:

- Undergraduate Research
- Ryan Graduate Fellowships
- IIN Postdoctoral Fellowships
- Worldwide Nanotechnology Town Halls
- Annual international IIN Symposium
- Nano Boot Camp for Clinicians
- All Scout Nano Day
- Frontiers in Nanotechnology Seminar Series

== Innovation Ecosystem ==
The IIN has created a new kind of research coalition with a large precompetitive nanoscale science and engineering platform for developing applications, demonstrating manufacturability and training skilled researchers.

== Nanotechnology Corporate Partners (NCP) Program ==
The IIN works on joint research initiatives with corporations including:

- Abbott
- Agilent Technologies
- Air Liquide
- Life Technologies
- Haemonetics
- AuraSense
- BASF Baxter
- Ciba
- DuPont
- FEI
- JEOL, Ltd
- Motorola
- Nanosphere, Inc
- Ohmx Corporation
- Praxair Technology, Inc.
- Rohm and Haas
- Shure Inc.
- Veeco Instruments Inc.
- ZEISS Global

== Small Business Partnership Commercialization Program ==
This program links institute researchers with venture capital experts and has resulted in the formation the 23 companies below, which have collectively raised over $1 billion in financing:

- Acumen Pharmaceuticals, Inc.
- American Bio-Optics
- AuraSense
- CDJ Technologies
- Citrics BioMedical
- Exicure
- iNfinitesimal
- Integrated Microdevices
- Nanodisc
- NanoIntegris
- NanoSonix
- Nanosphere, Inc.
- Nanotope
- NUMat Technologies
- Ohmx Corporation
- PanaceaNano
- Polyera
- PreDx
- SAMDITech
- SilenTech
- TERA-Print
- Vybyl Biopharma
- Zylem Biosciences, Inc.
