= Gabrielle A. Brenner =

Canadian economist

Gabrielle A. Brenner is an Associate Professor of Economics. She holds a Bachelor of Science in Mathematics and master's degree in economics from the University of Jerusalem as well as a Ph.D. in economics from the University of Chicago. She is particularly interested by the areas of entrepreneurship, game theory, and the operation of competitive and regulated markets. Brenner specializes in decision making in situations involving risk.

== Career ==
Brenner is an associate professor in Economics at the Hautes Études Commerciales (HEC Montréal). She is also an Associate member of the Chaire d’entrepreneuriat Rogers – J.-A.-Bombardier.

Brenner has participated in several studies on the development of entrepreneurship in North America and West Africa. She also contributed to studies on entrepreneurship in ethnic communities and the role it plays in the social integration of immigrants.

Brenner has worked on numerous programs to develop entrepreneurship. She served as a consultant for the World Bank, UNIDO, and CIDA.

== Publications ==
=== Books ===
- Brenner, R., Brenner, G.A., and Brown, A., A World of Chance, Cambridge University Press, 2008.
- Brenner, R. and Brenner, G., Gambling and Speculation, Cambridge, Cambridge University Press, 1990, pp. vii-286, published in French in Paris by Presses Universitaires de France, 1993.

=== Articles ===
- (and Brenner, R.) "Gambling: Shaping an opinion", Journal of Gambling Studies, v. 6, no. 4 (1990), pp. 297–311.
- (and Brenner, R.) "Les Innovations et La Loi Sur la Concurrence", Actualité Economique, v. 65, no.1 (1989), pp. 146–63.
- (and Brenner, R.), "Intrepreneurship - Le nouveau nom d'un vieux phénomène", Revue internationale de gestion, September 1988.
