= Reactions to the 2024 Gaza war protests at universities =

- Part of Gaza war protests (at universities (in 2024))
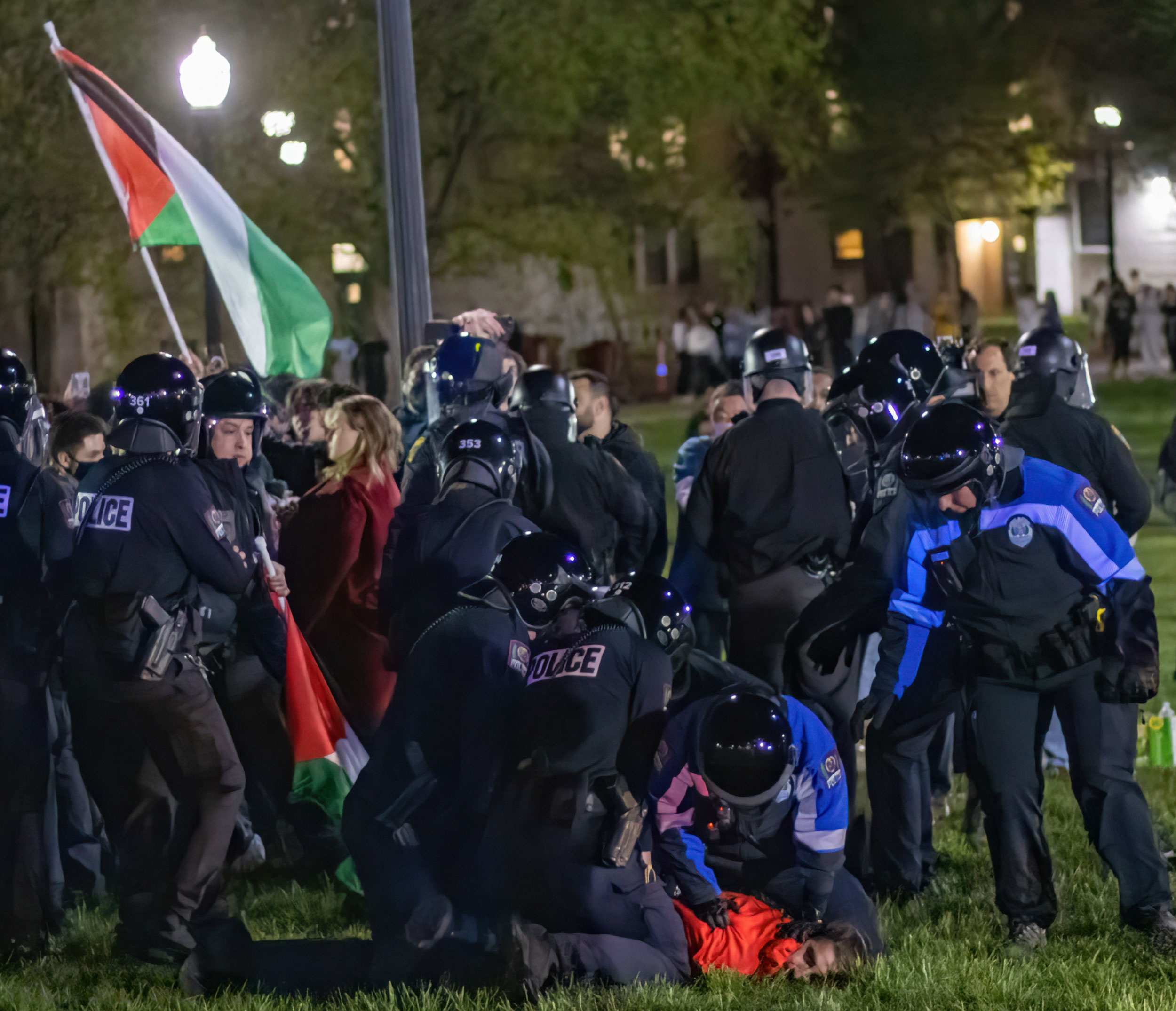
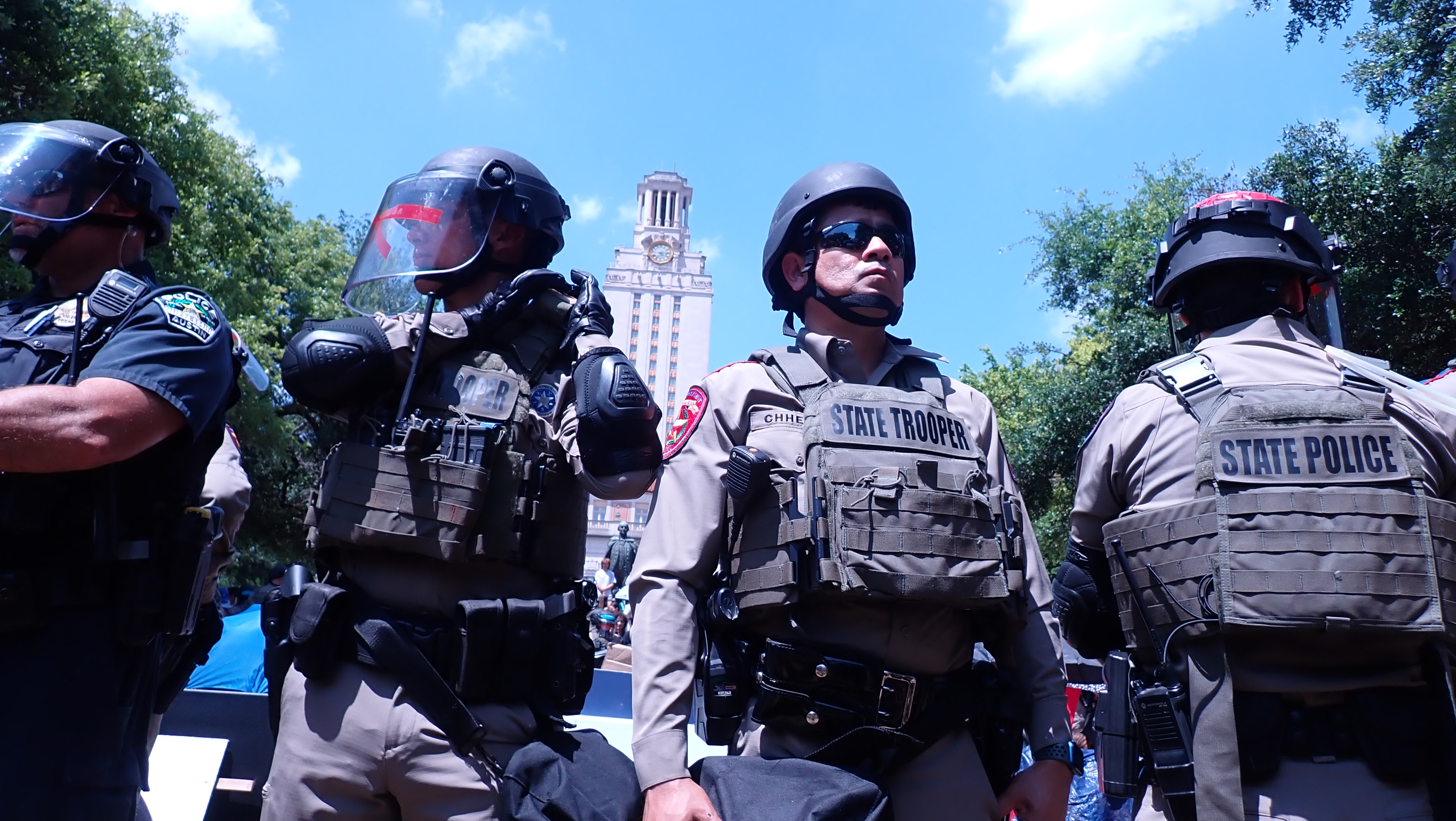
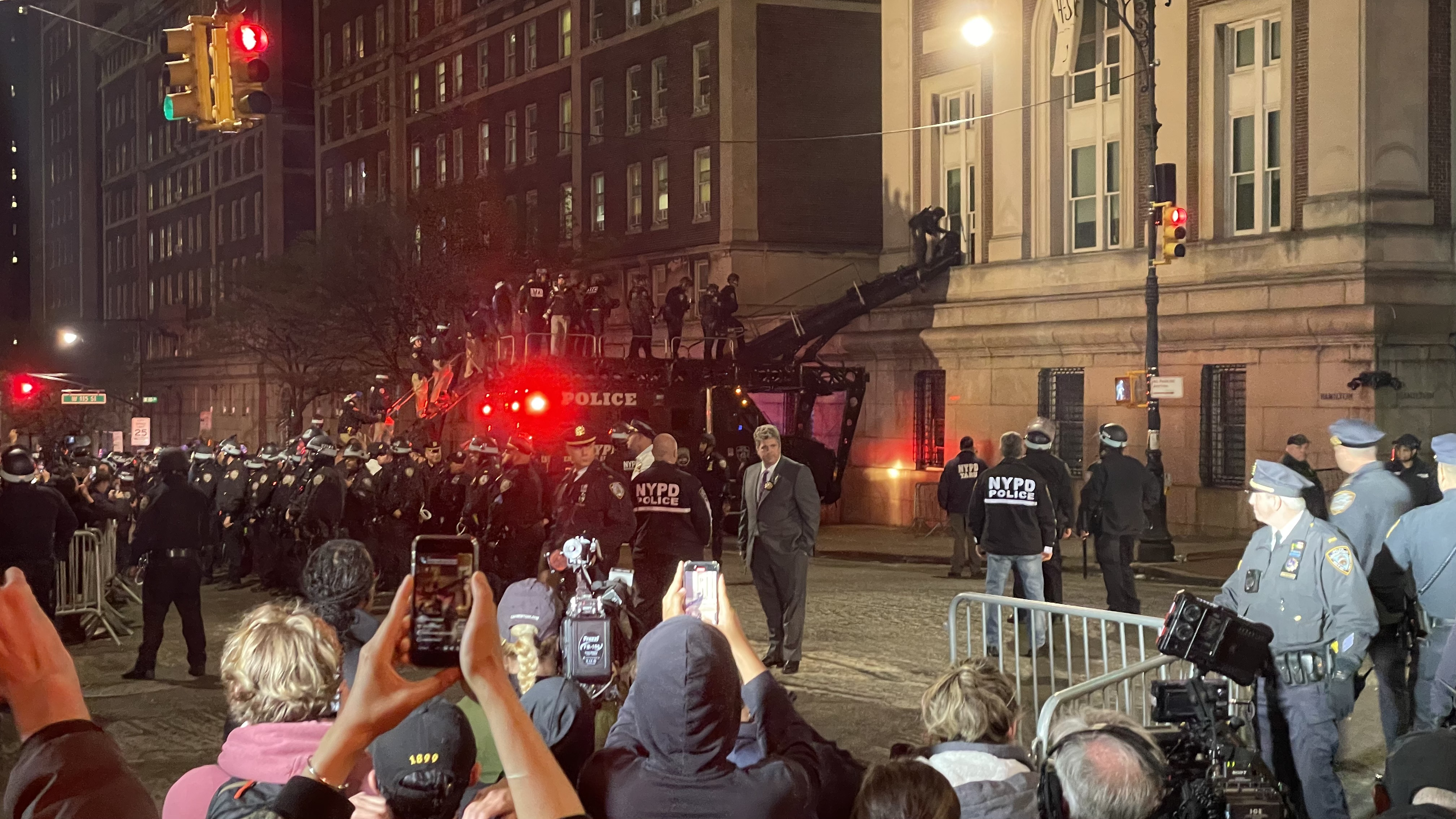
- Top to bottom: Officers arresting a pro-Palestinian protester at the Ohio State University Gaza Solidarity Encampment, April 25, 2024; State troopers occupy parts of UT Austin campus to confront protesters, April 2024; NYPD officers preparing to raid Hamilton Hall line up aboard a Lenco BearCat, evening of April 30.
- Date: April 17, 2024 – present (2 years, 7 months and 2 days)
- Location: Global; primarily in Australia, Netherlands, United Kingdom, and United States

Gaza solidarity protests on university campuses escalated in April 2024, spreading in the United States and other countries, as part of wider protests against the war and genocide in Gaza. With over 3,100 protesters arrested in the U.S., universities suspended and expelled student protesters, in some cases evicting them from campus housing, and relied on police to forcibly disband occupations.

Most universities in the spring attempted to negotiate a disbandment of the encampments, often threatening police sweeps to force an agreement. Many universities initiated disciplinary proceedings against protesters, accusing them of breaking student codes of conduct, before employing police sweeps. Police departments in the U.S. employed a range of tactics, including dispersing crowds using horses and police in riot gear, deploying pepper balls, using tasers, mass arrests, tear gas, clearing unauthorized encampments, and beating both students and professors. Police also assaulted, arrested and restricted access for some journalists. The police response to the protests was criticized by some Democrats and human rights organizations. By fall 2024, many universities had strengthened their restrictions on protests, including more than 100 colleges and universities, and several schools had banned camping on their grounds among other restrictions.

Over 200 groups expressed support for the protests, as well as U.S. Senator Bernie Sanders, various members of Congress, several labor unions, hundreds of university staff in the United Kingdom, and Iran's supreme leader Ali Khamenei. Protests were otherwise condemned by leaders including President Joe Biden, Prime Minister of the Netherlands Mark Rutte, and Israeli Prime Minister Benjamin Netanyahu; as well as concern raised from Australian Prime Minister Anthony Albanese, UK Prime Minister Rishi Sunak, and Canadian Prime Minister Justin Trudeau.

== Background ==
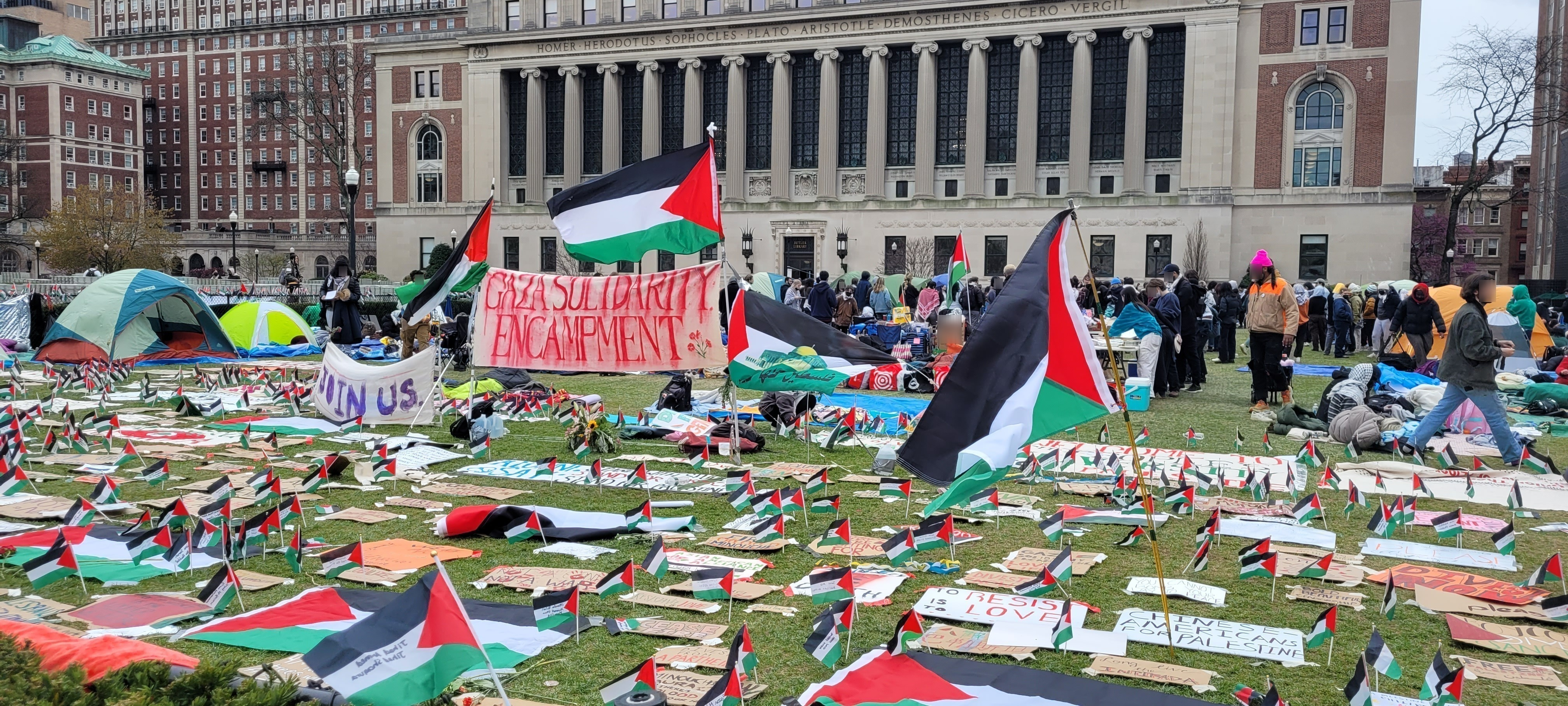
The reinstated Gaza Solidarity Encampment at Columbia University, 21 April 2024

By May 6, 2024, student protests had occurred in 45 of the 50 states in the United States and the District of Columbia, with encampments, occupations, walkouts or sit-ins on almost 140 campuses. Thirty-four encampments were established in the United Kingdom; across universities in Australia, beginning with the University of Sydney; and in Canada, including an encampment at McGill University. On May 7, protests spread further on European campuses after mass arrests at the University of Amsterdam campus occupation, including occupation of campus buildings at Leipzig University in Germany, Sciences Po in France, and Ghent University in Belgium. By May 8, protests had taken place in more than 25 countries, and on May 13, approximately 1,000 Dutch students and university staff took part in a national walk-out.

== Administrative response ==
Most universities that faced encampment protests in the spring attempted to negotiate a settlement and disbandment of the encampments with student leaders, often threatening police sweeps to force an agreement. In some cases, the end of the school year allowed administrators to reverse course on agreements they had negotiated, such as at the University of Oregon, Northwestern, and Rutgers New Brunswick. Many universities initially initiated disciplinary proceedings against protesters, accusing them of breaking student codes of conduct.

Students at New York University (NYU) were required to write "coerced confessions of wrongdoing" in order to have disciplinary charges against them dropped. Graduate student Dan Zeno was among more than 20 students Massachusetts Institute of Technology (MIT) suspended for participating in the protests. He was evicted from campus housing along with his wife and daughter. Some students who faced suspensions were banned from campus and were unable to take their final exams. UC Santa Cruz officials issued two-week campus bans to many of the 110 protesters arrested during a campus demonstration in May, leaving them without housing and access to campus resources. The City College of New York shut down its community food pantry in response to protests. In Greece, nine protesters from European countries were arrested at the Athens University Law School and faced deportation in May.

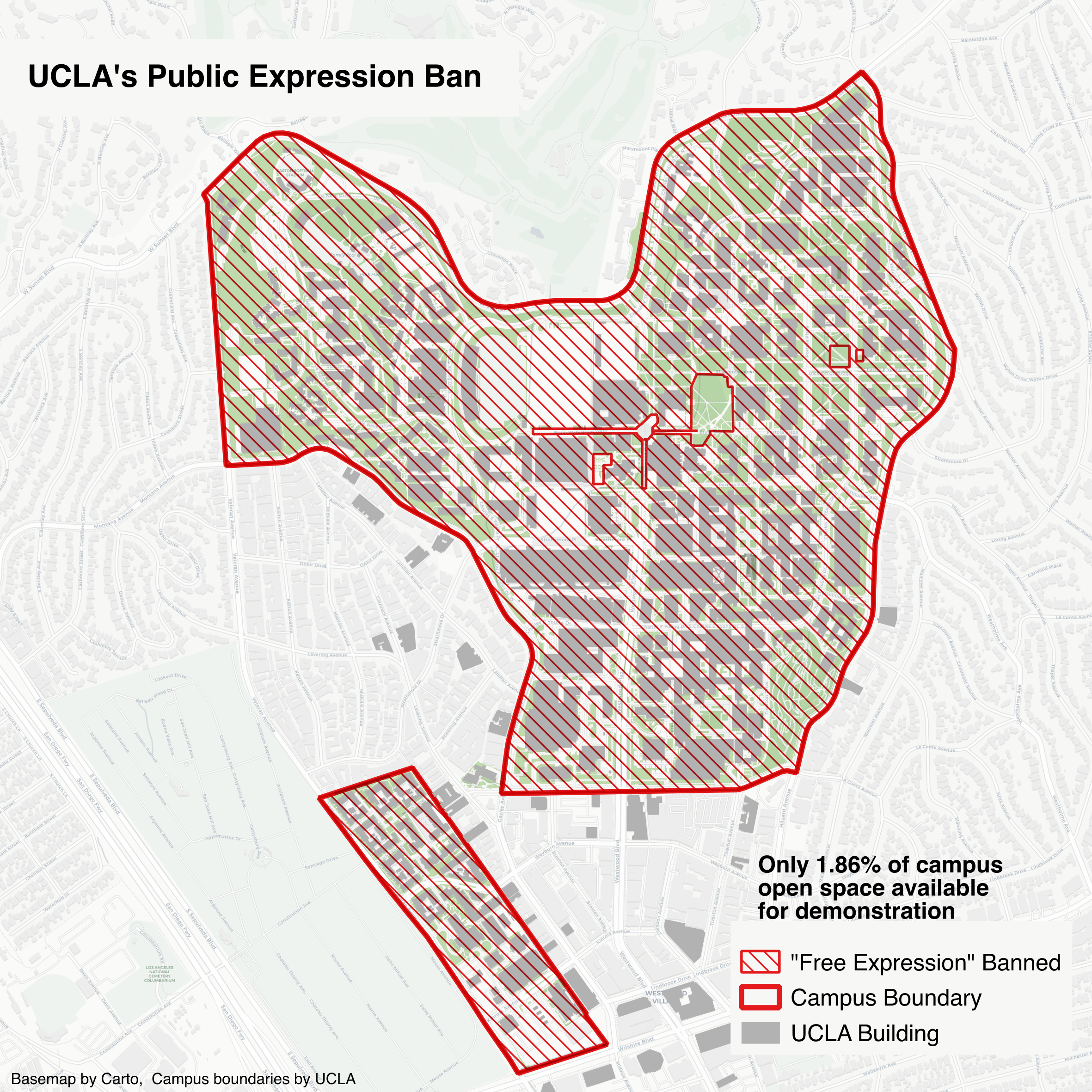
A map of UCLA campus showing updated restrictions on free expression

As students returned to campus in fall 2024 after a wave of protests in the spring, many universities strengthened their restrictions on student protests and political activities, including limits on where and when protests could occur, and prohibitions on student encampments. More than 100 colleges and university systems tightened their rules about protests on their property. Several schools banned camping on their grounds, required protesters to register with the administration in advance of any demonstrations, and banned the wearing of masks.

Cornell professor Risa Lieberwitz called the nationwide trend toward increased restrictions on campus protests "a resurgence of repression on campuses that we haven't seen since the late 1960s". Case Western Reserve University limited permitted demonstrations to two hours during the daytime in a single location. The Middle East Studies Association said that although it was not compelled by a subpoena to do so, the University of Pennsylvania had turned over the CVs and syllabi of two professors to the House Committee on Education and the Workforce and may also have given the committee access to their email and course communications.

Harvard updated its policy to prohibit overnight camping, chalk, and unapproved signs or displays. Indiana University (IU) updated its policies on August 1, prohibiting all "expressive activity" between 11 p.m. and 6 a.m. The American Civil Liberties Union sued IU over this policy, calling it "overly broad". NYU updated its nondiscrimination policy to prohibit criticism of Zionism, classifying it as a protected category. Columbia classified the use of the term "Zionist" to refer to Israelis or Jews as a form of harassment. At Swarthmore College in Pennsylvania, students who used bullhorns during their protest faced expulsion from the university due to a new policy against "loud chanting".

In August 2024, Carnegie Mellon University updated its policy to require protests, rallies, and other expressive events of more than 25 people to register the participants' names with the university in advance. Columbia suspended its due-process procedures for student discipline, notifying several dozen students charged with disciplinary infractions that scheduled interviews related to their cases were to be skipped and they would be fast-tracked into conduct hearings. This came after renewed congressional pressure and a subpoena on university records related to the protests. University of California, Los Angeles (UCLA) introduced new regulations on campus protests that restrict "public expression activities" to areas around Bruinwalk and outside Murphy Hall. The new restrictions also banned tents and camping equipment, food distribution, amplified sound, and chalk, and require people on campus to identify themselves when asked to do so by a university official. Ahead of the fall semester, the University of California and California State University systems instituted broad new policies prohibiting encampments, barricades, overnight encampments, disguises, disruptions and restrictions on free movement.

In September 2024, the University of Vermont's chapter of Students for Justice in Palestine sued the school after an interim suspension of the group continued into its fifth month. At Cornell, a graduate student with U.K. citizenship was suspended without due process and threatened with deportation for participating in a demonstration outside Statler Hotel, where a job fair that included recruiters from weapons manufacturing companies was being held. Maura Finkelstein became the first tenured Muhlenberg College professor to be fired over pro-Palestinian speech (tenured professor Sami Al-Arian had been fired in 2003, and scholar Steven Salaita in 2014). Finkelstein, who is Jewish, shared an Instagram post by Palestinian poet Remi Kanazi calling for the shunning of Zionist ideology and its supporters with "Do not cower to Zionists. Shame them. .. Don't normalize Zionism. Don't normalize Zionists taking up space." The college determined that she had violated its equal opportunity and nondiscrimination policies.

In October 2024, The University of Michigan's governing board coordinated with Michigan Attorney General Dana Nessel to file charges against pro-Palestinian protesters after local prosecutors proved unwilling to crack down. Campaign contributions and business relationships between Nessel and University of Michigan regents raised concerns over conflicts of interest in the prosecutions, as did contributions by pro-Israel lobbyists to Nessel's election campaigns. The university paid over $800,000 between June 2023 and September 2024 to undercover investigators to surveil and intimidate pro-Palestinian campus groups.

The Hillel Foundation announced a partnership at over 50 campuses with the Secure Community Network called Operation Secure our Campuses, offering "full-time intelligence analysts [to] monitor campus developments and provide information and real-time support." At the University of Toronto, patrol teams with Magen Herut Canada monitored a pro-Palestinian protest. At Yale College, the Women's Center was notified that it would be required to adopt a policy of "broad neutrality" after the center was forced to indefinitely postpone an event titled "Pinkwashing and Feminism(s) in Gaza" due to fear of administrative disciplinary action. At UC Berkeley, law school dean Erwin Chemerinsky wrote an opinion piece comparing antiwar protesters to the KKK. The board of the Berkeley Journal of Black Law & Policy condemned Chemerinsky's comparison, calling it "careless and intentionally inflammatory".

== Police response ==
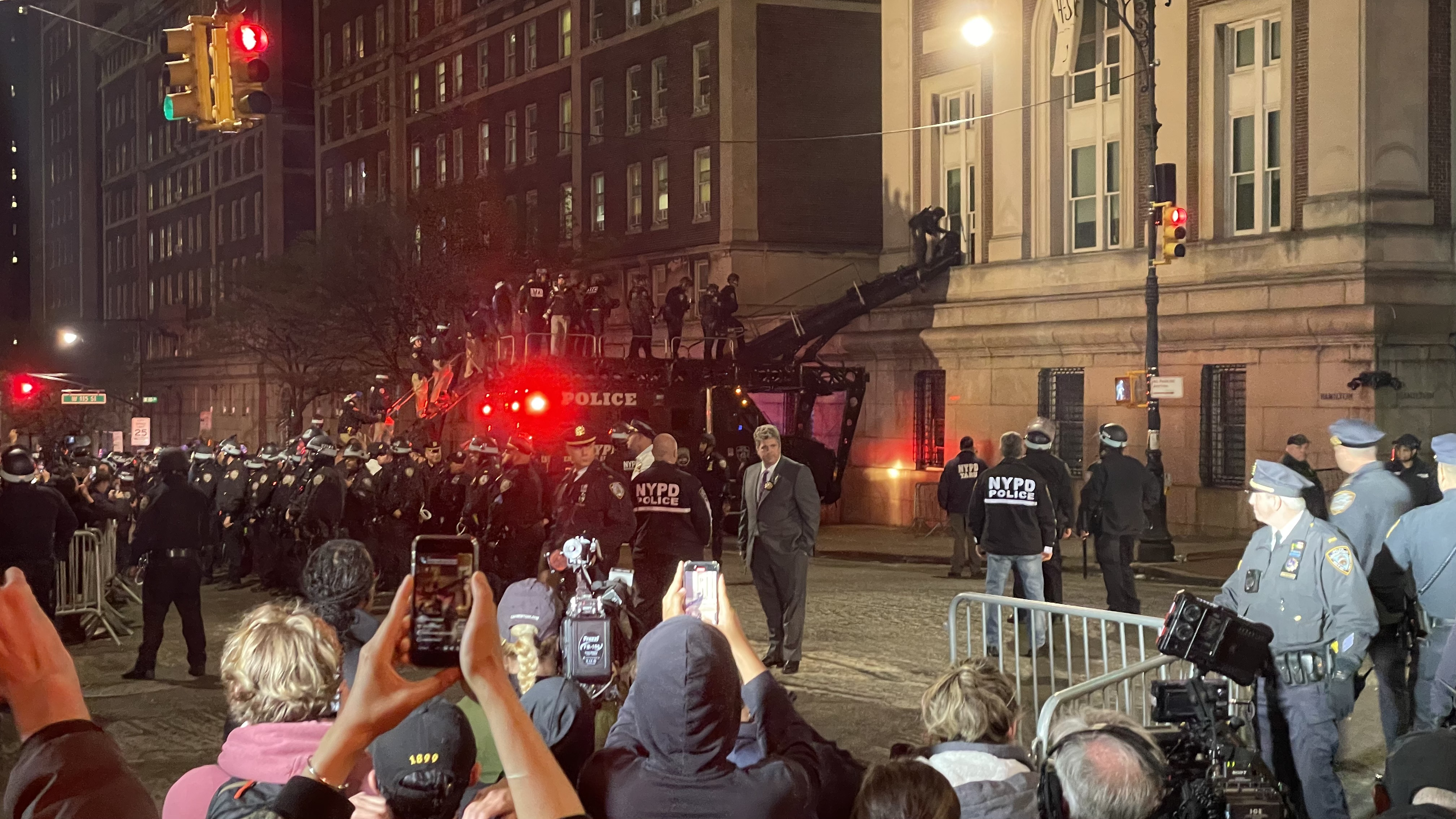
NYPD raiding Hind's Hall at Columbia University, breaking in through the window

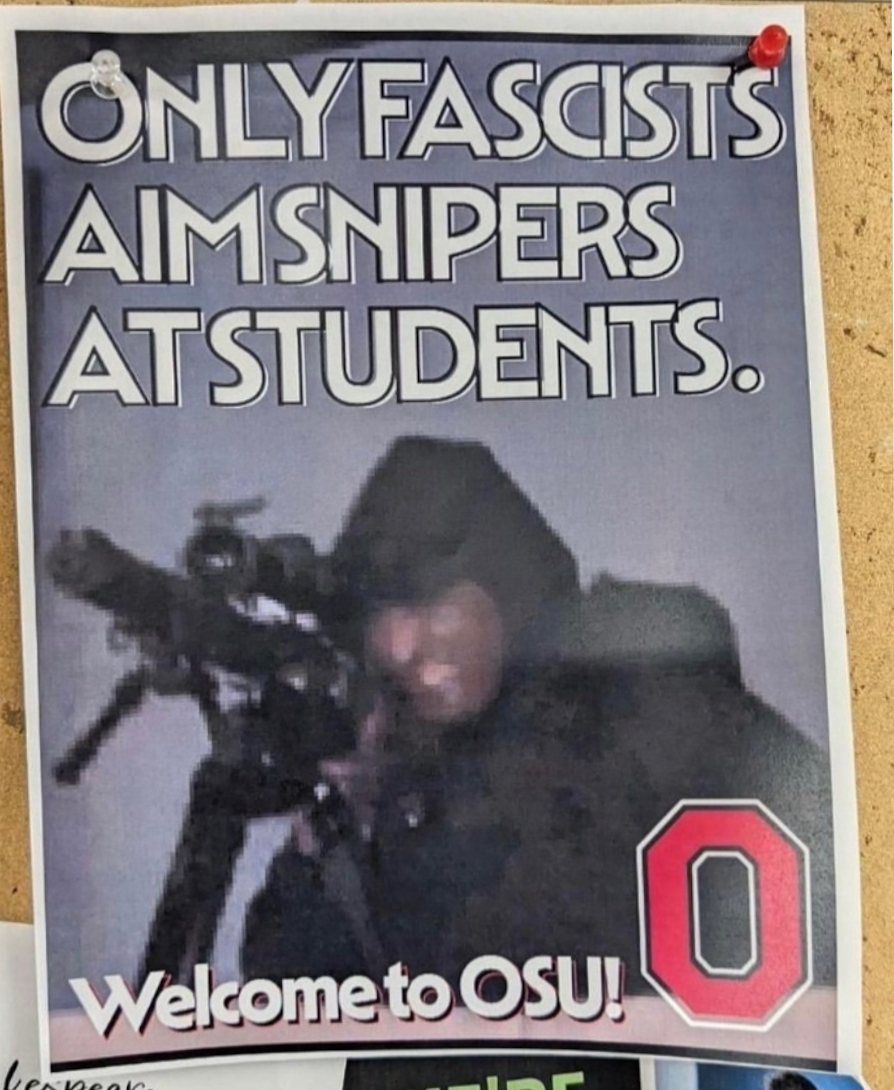
Propaganda poster at Ohio State University after mass arrests

Police departments in the U.S. employed a range of tactics, including dispersing crowds using horses and police in riot gear, deploying pepper balls, using tasers, mass arrests, tear gas, clearing unauthorized encampments, and beating both students and professors. According to student newspaper The Lantern, state troopers with "long-range firearms" were also deployed at Ohio State University. Over 3,100 protesters were arrested in the U.S.

Police assaulted, arrested and restricted access for some journalists while they were covering the protests. Police used force when arresting faculty who were taking part in or observing the protests, including the former chair of Dartmouth College's Jewish studies department, who was slammed to the ground while "in a line of women faculty in their 60s to 80s trying to protect our students", and two members of the faculty at Emory University, one of whom was charged with battery after being "violently arrested" on video.

On June 10, UCLA police severely wounded a student with a non-lethal projectile, giving him a heart contusion and a bruised lung. In September, UCLA police sought approval to double their stockpile of pepper balls and sponge rounds and obtain eight new projectile launchers and three drones. In October, Penn Police raided the off-campus home of pro-Palestinian student protesters, saying they were executing a search warrant related to vandalism. Student organizers said rifles and handguns were pointed at them during the raid, and that police refused to tell them their badge numbers or show their warrant.

According to Erik Baker, the most severe crackdowns on campus protests took place at "wealthy schools ... that have been in long-running and occasionally violent conflict with the working-class communities of color that border them", such as the University of Chicago, Washington University in St. Louis, The University of Southern California, and Columbia.

A report by Armed Conflict Location and Event Data Project found that police interventions at U.S. student protests linked to conflict issues surged fourfold in April. Authorities notably increased arrests and forcible dispersals, especially at protests where there were counter-demonstrators. Nonetheless, at events where student protesters were unchallenged, the police were more likely to act against pro-Palestine rallies, doing so over four times more often than against pro-Israel ones. Police repression of protesters, particularly in the U.S., has been characterized as unusually harsh.

The New York Times reported that though more than 3,000 student protesters were arrested across the U.S., most charges were dropped, and the vast majority of charges were misdemeanors or lower offenses. Prosecutors usually either decided to prioritize other cases or calculated that jurors would be receptive to First Amendment arguments. Students who had charges dropped often faced significant academic consequences, such as suspension or withheld diplomas. Schools with hundreds of arrests often had students waiting for cases to resolve.

A number of influential business leaders, including Daniel Lubetzky, Daniel Loeb, Len Blavatnik, Joseph Sitt, Howard Schultz, Michael Dell, Bill Ackman, Joshua Kushner, Ted Deutch and Yakir Gabay coordinated an effort in a WhatsApp group chat to urge Mayor Adams to crack down on the encampment at Columbia. They offered to pay for private investigators to assist police, and made donations to Adams's 2025 campaign.

== By country ==
=== Australia ===
The Group of Eight, of which the universities of Adelaide, Melbourne, Sydney, Queensland, Monash and ANU are part, has sought legal advice on using terms such as "intifada" and "from the river to the sea", and has said it would ban those phrases if given definitive legal advice that they are unlawful. It said such phrases are "deeply offensive to many in the Jewish community". It sent a letter to Attorney-General Mark Dreyfus asking for legal advice on whether these phrases violate Commonwealth law. Dreyfus wrote back that he does not give legal advice, noting the universities were taking external legal advice. He added that Section 18C of the Racial Discrimination Act 1975 "makes it a civil offence to do a public act that is reasonably likely to offend, insult, humiliate or intimidate people because of their race, colour or national or ethnic origins. A person aggrieved by an alleged act of racial discrimination can make a complaint to the Australian Human Rights Commission". Sydney and Monash urged students not to use the phrases, but stopped short of banning them.

Jewish staff and students at the University of Queensland created an alternative Camp Shalom in the Great Court. which ran from 29 April to 10 May.

Victoria Police Chief Commissioner Shane Patton has raised concerns that protests could become violent, like they have in the US. He said he is meeting with university security. He said the police do not want the "existing tension" and that universities must consider "how much more risk they're accepting by allowing these encampments to continue". Deputy Commissioner Neil Paterson wrote to the vice chancellors of the University of Melbourne, Monash, RMIT, Deakin and La Trobe, asking them to "carefully consider the risks" of allowing the encampments to continue. Organizers downplayed the risk of violence or escalation, saying the campuses are safe and that the encampments are a peaceful protest for the Palestinian people. Universities have resisted the calls for the police to end to the protests, with the Group of Eight saying the encampments are held on public land and that police are free to enter at any time, with the universities having acted appropriately to breaches of the law, saying they are "in the business of de-escalation" and not wanting to see violence erupt, as it has in the US. Police are being called "daily" to protests, with incidents of harassment and violence being investigated at Monash and Deakin.

Prime Minister Anthony Albanese has taken a neutral stance on the protests, saying he is worried about social cohesion. Albanese has criticized usage of the phrase "from the river to the sea", calling it "provocative" and agreeing when asked whether it is a "very violent statement". Education Minister Jason Clare has expressed concern about students feeling unsafe, saying, "I want more people to go to university, not less". He said that whilst there will always be protests in a democracy, there is no place for bigotry, including antisemitism and Islamophobia.

The Greens have expressed support for the protests. On May 2, The Greens NSW issued a statement expressing solidarity with the encampment at the University of Sydney calling for the government to increase pressure on Israel to achieve a permanent ceasefire and calling for universities to cut ties with Israeli universities and weapons manufacturers supplying Israel. After the first attack on the Monash camp, the Victorian Greens issued a statement that universities and police must better protect protesters. Greens MPs have attended pro-Palestine protests since the start of the war.

Liberal/National Coalition leader Peter Dutton has been sharply critical of the protests, calling universities that are allowing them to continue "weak". He said Prime Minister Albanese "needs to stand up and show some backbone here and call for an end to these nonsense protests". Other Coalition members have been similarly critical, with education spokesperson Sarah Henderson and senior frontbencher Michael Sukkar saying the protests should be forcibly broken up. Henderson said universities should be fined if they do not do so. She has called for a Senate enquiry into antisemitism at universities. On May 9, Dutton compared the protesters chants of "from the river to the sea" to "what Hitler chanted in the '30s", in response to Education Minister Jason Clare saying the chants of "from the river to the sea" and "intifada" mean "different things to different people". A Jewish group formed after the start of the war, the Jewish Council of Australia, set up in opposition to other peak Jewish bodies in Australia such as the Executive Council of Australian Jewry with regards to support of Israel and the weaponization of antisemitism, said Dutton's interpretations were "a very bad-faith reading" of the chants.

=== Netherlands ===
The protests were condemned by Prime Minister Mark Rutte, as well as by various other high-ranking Dutch politicians. Mariëlle Paul, the Dutch Minister for Primary and Secondary Education, suggested several times that it is "very questionable" whether the "rioters are actually students".

An "emergency debate" was called on 10 May by the Government of Amsterdam in response to the police intervention earlier during the first protest on 6 May. Despite criticism, mayor Femke Halsema stood by her decision to let police intervene during the demonstration. Around 250 protesters demonstrated during the meeting outside the Stopera, where the meeting was held, dubbing this the "fifth day of student protests".

On 11 May, the "sixth day of protests", a pro-Palestine protest in Amsterdam attracted over 10,000 people. Many demonstrators denounced the police action earlier that week. Some protesters also called for Halsema to resign. On May 30, Halsema participated in a Room for Discussion event, where she spoke with students of the University of Amsterdam, and where she again stood by her decisions. The response from participating students was predominantly negative.

The Dutch Student Union declared its solidarity with the student movement, and was critical regarding the treatment of student protesters by police. The union also pointed out the lack of student democracy and student representation in universities, which they deemed an underlying problem and a cause of the protests. The Dutch Student Union also published a joint statement with the Amsterdam Student Union (ASVA Studentenvakbond) specifically condemning police intervention during the protests in Amsterdam.

Amnesty International was also critical of the police intervention during the first protests at the University of Amsterdam. According to the organisation, police failed to take opportunities for de-escalation at a number of crucial moments. Insufficient distinction was made between peaceful demonstrators and people who used violence. Amnesty International was also critical of the attitudes towards protests in the current political climate. The student branch of Amnesty International Utrecht held a solidarity event on May 10.

The police interventions during the protests at Utrecht University, which included moving protesters to different locations on behalf of the Public Prosecution Service, were called unlawful by experts in the field of criminal law, including professors and lawyers.

=== United Kingdom ===
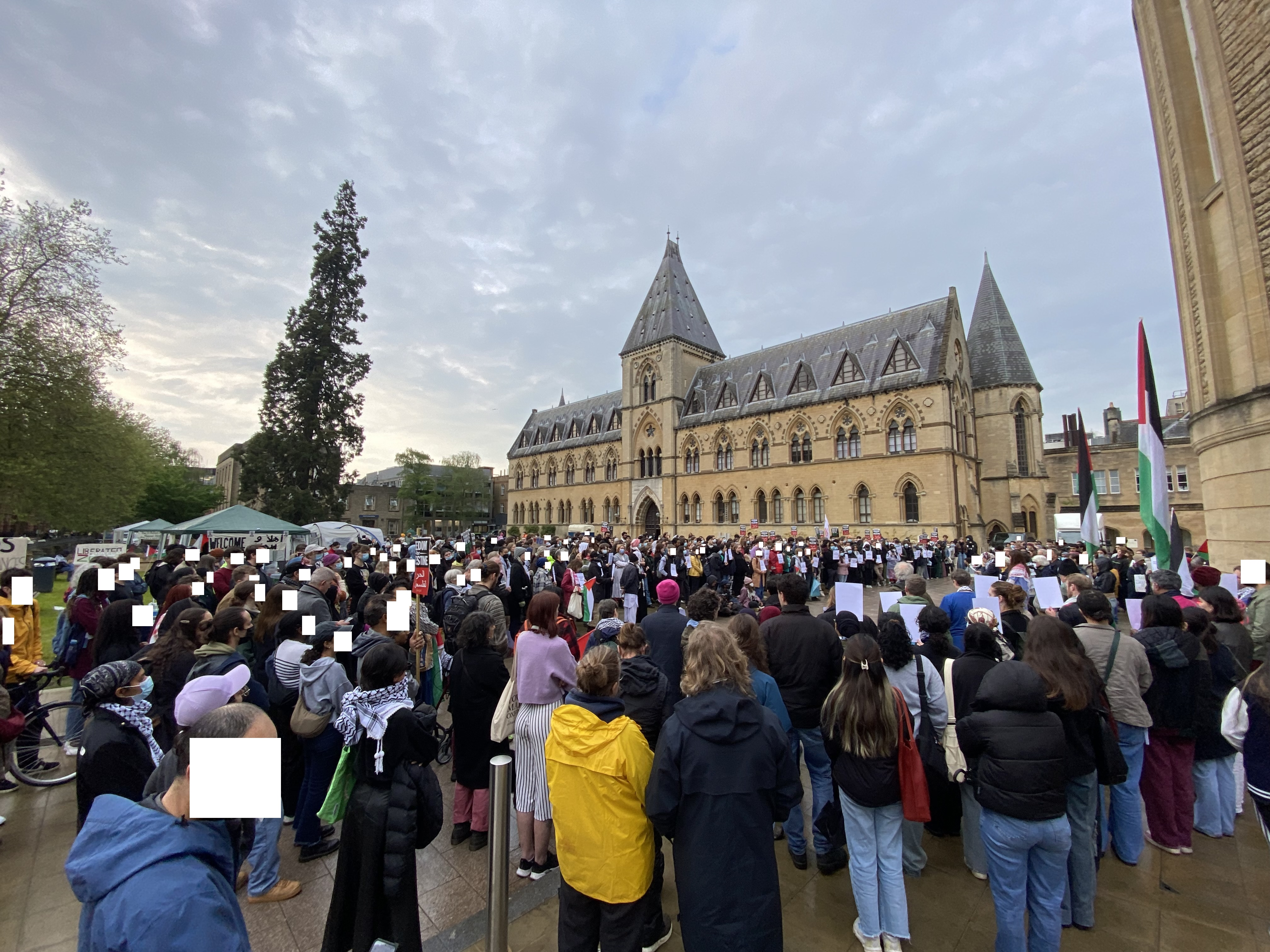
Photograph of first Oxford Palestinian solidarity encampment, front lawn of Oxford University Museum of Natural History

With encampments taking place at institutions and concern over what the president of the Union of Jewish Students described as rising antisemitism on campuses, UK Prime Minister Rishi Sunak held a meeting with vice chancellors of higher education institutions. In response, academics accused Sunak of "scaremongering". According to The Guardian, "Vice-chancellors insist they have no desire to quell challenge or stop difficult discussions on their campuses, arguing that this is part of the core purpose of a university". Vice-chancellor of the University of the West of England Steve West said there "was no evidence" that UK protests were "getting out of hand" and called on the government to avoid inflaming the situation. The president of advocacy group Universities UK, Dame Sally Mapstone, said universities "may need to take action" but that there "should be no presumption universities would clear protest encampments". The New York Times reported that authorities took a more "permissive approach" to protests on campuses, with an emphasis on facilitating free speech, and that British polling indicates that a majority supports a ceasefire.

Many academics have supported students' demands and expressed solidarity with the protests. Hundreds of university employees, including 300 at Cambridge University and staff at Oxford and Edinburgh universities, signed open letters in support of the encampments and accusing their institutions of complicity in the Israeli attacks. At Durham University, over 200 university staff signed an open letter in support of the protest there on Palace Green and called on the university to negotiate with the protestors. At Leeds University, members of the Universities and Colleges Union that represents academic and professional staff called for "teach outs" to be held at the encampment. Twelve Jewish staff members at Oxford wrote an open letter disputing the university's claim that the encampment was intimidating to Jewish staff and students and saying that the university had ignored Jewish people who supported the encampment.

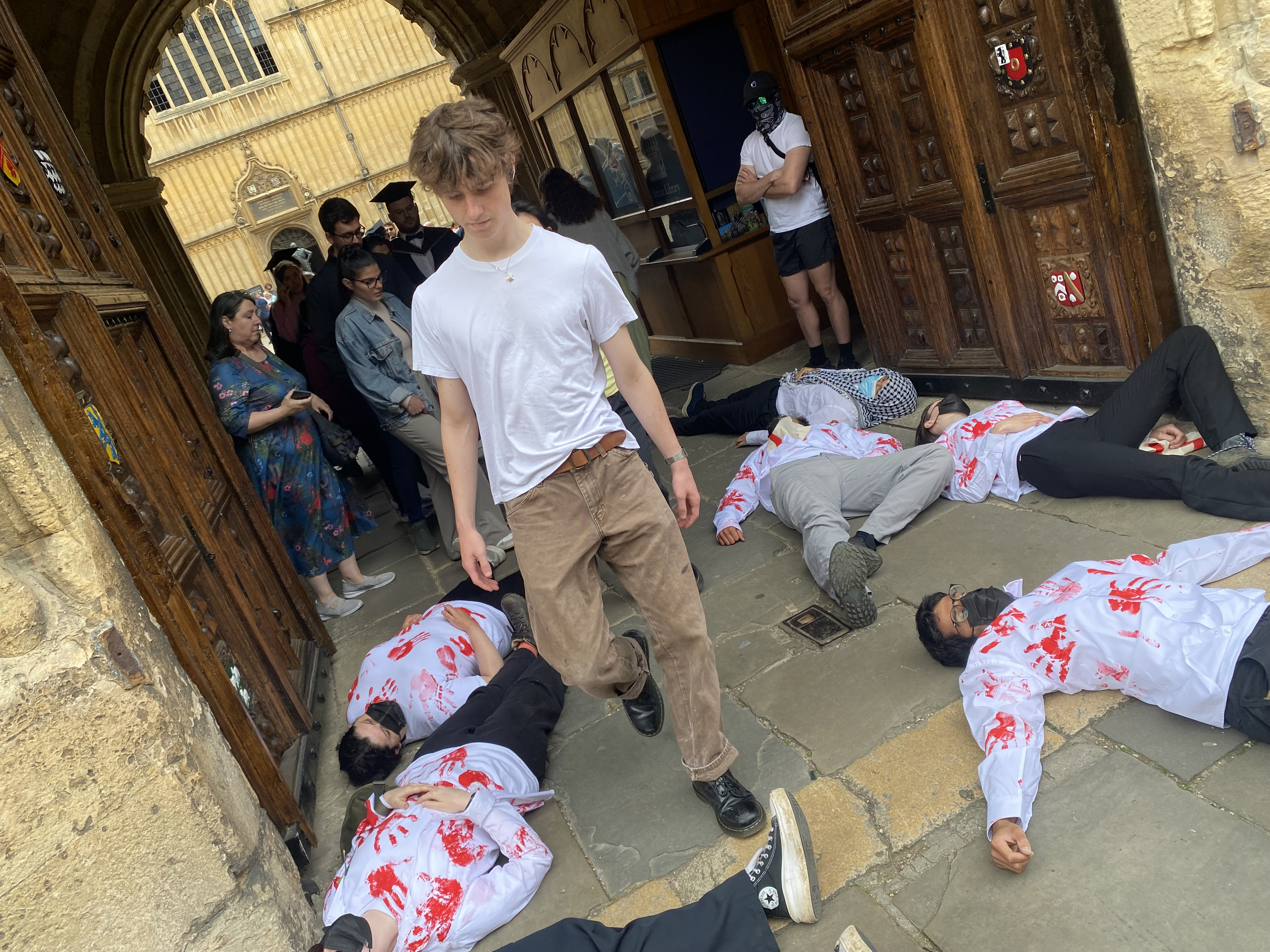
A die-in demonstration at the Bodleian Library during an Oxford university graduation ceremony, May 2024

Durham University was accused of failing to support free speech after a debate at the Durham Union on the topic "This house believes that the Palestinian leadership is the biggest barrier to peace" was postponed on police advice of a threat to public safety, with pro-Palestinian protesters blocking the entrance to the building. One of the scheduled speakers in favor of the motion said the university had refused to give police permission to take action against the protesters, while another said the university had "cav[ed] in to a fascist mob". The Durham student paper Palatinate noted that "even this protest remained remarkably peaceful".

After protesters set up an encampment at Birmingham University, the university ordered them to leave the premises on May 14, describing the occupation as trespassing. According to The Telegraph, this was the first time one of the 20 student encampments in the UK had been ordered to disperse. Protesters said they were "threatened with police action". Birmingham University began legal action to remove the encampment on June 11. The encampment within the Marshall Building at the London School of Economics was evicted on June 17 following a court order on June 14, making it the first UK encampment to be removed following legal action. Queen Mary University of London also began court action against its encampment. Elsewhere, encampments disbanded voluntarily at Swansea in early June, citing "significant wins" including divestment from Barclays Bank, at Imperial College on June 20, and at Durham on June 21. On June 23, Oxford University erected a fence around the encampment outside the Pitt Rivers Museum (one of two camps at the university), leading the protesters to abandon the camp on June 25, with some saying they had been denied access to toilets and bathrooms. The university dismantled the camp shortly afterwards.

On July 7, The Guardian reported that "Of the 36 encampments in England, Wales and Scotland at the end of May, around a dozen are still active", with the others having dispersed due to hostility from their institutions and waning enthusiasm following the end of the academic year. Those remaining included encampments at Birmingham, Bristol, QMUL and SOAS in London, Nottingham, Newcastle, Oxford, and Reading, with many of these facing legal action or the threat of legal action. On July 8, Oxford Action for Palestine announced that the second encampment, outside the Radcliffe Camera, had been disbanded following threats of legal action from the university. On July 10, the universities of Birmingham and Nottingham won separate legal cases resulting in summary possession orders against the encampments established on their campuses. The camp at QMUL was also removed following a court order on July 10. The Reading encampment closed voluntarily on May 31 after being asked to leave by the university but without legal action being taken. The Bristol encampment ended in mid-July after winning the first stage of a legal case brought by the university but unable to afford the legal fees necessary to continue their defense. University College London was awarded a summary possession order on August 6 against the campus established in the quad of the UCL Main Building on May 2.

=== United States ===
==== Faculty and staff ====
Rebecca Karl, a professor at NYU, said that historically, "there have been a number of confrontations that have been dealt with by universities in ways that stress that we are not a violent institution... I'm personally very concerned". Wadie Said, a professor at the University of Colorado, said, "The First Amendment is the hallmark of freedom.. You see that being curtailed based on viewpoint discrimination, which is something not supposed to be allowed under the First Amendment". Jeremi Suri, a UT Austin professor, said, "I witnessed the police—the state police, the campus police, the city police—an army of police... stormed into the student crowd and started arresting students".

Jody Armour, a professor at USC, said, "We need to stop allowing people to weaponise anti-Semitism against real, valid protests." In reference to protesters, John McWhorter, a Columbia professor, said, "I find it very hard to imagine that they are antisemitic", adding that there is "a fine line between questioning Israel's right to exist and questioning Jewish people's right to exist" but that "some of the rhetoric amid the protests crosses it". Randall Kuhn, a UCLA professor, said, "I find it repugnant to sit by while Palestinian professors are being killed, while academic buildings are being bombed relentlessly."

In September 2024, the Council of UC Faculty Associations filed an official complaint against the University of California system, saying faculty were being targeted if they spoke out against the war in Gaza. In October 2024, 25 professors at Harvard University held a silent "study-in" protest at Widener Library, leading to a two-week suspension from the library.

In October 2025, Kent Syverud, the chancellor of Syracuse University, stated that the protests on campus seemed to have been encouraged by Iran. He emphasized that, although there was an initially welcoming atmosphere for both pro-Israel and pro-Palestinian activities during the early months of October 2023, a noticeable shift occurred later. Syverud expressed his belief that Iran played a significant role in fostering the demonstrations, pointing out that there was little to no involvement from the university's own students in the protests.

A report from the Middle East Studies Association (MESA), released on October 8, 2026, says that its Academic Freedom Initiative documented 196 incidents of employment retaliation against higher education employees in the United States and Canada tied to Palestine-related speech and advocacy. The period covered runs from October 7, 2023, through August 20, 2026. Out of those 196 incidents, 76 ended in termination. The report’s conclusions were drawn from an analysis of the incidents it recorded and interviews with 31 employees who had faced retaliation.

==== Organizations ====
The Council on American-Islamic Relations executive director Afaf Nasher criticized the use of police force to break up the protests, saying it undermined academic freedom. Civil rights advocates such as the American Civil Liberties Union have raised free speech concerns over the mass arrests that were seen during the protests. The United Nations High Commissioner for Human Rights, Volker Türk, described some of the responses from law enforcement as "disproportionate in their impacts" and was "troubled" by how they were being dealt with. The UN Secretary-General Antonio Guterres said that while "hate speech is unacceptable", it is "essential in all circumstances to guarantee the freedom of expression and the freedom of peaceful demonstration." Farida Shaheed, the U.N. special rapporteur on the right to education, said the increase in attacks on student protests represented "a concerning erosion of intellectual freedom and democratic principles within educational settings". Sarah Leah Whitson, executive director of Democracy for the Arab World Now, called the "violent dismantling of pro-Palestine encampments and arrests of student protesters a dangerous assault on our democracy".

Several labor unions that previously supported a ceasefire in the Gaza war have expressed support for the protests, including the Service Employees International Union (SEIU). The SEIU said it "proudly stands in solidarity with the students, faculty and staff exercising their right to speak up". In contrast, Jonathan Greenblatt of the ADL said that protesters concealing their identities were dressed like "bank robbers" and had the effect of "intimidating their opponents, of menacing the other side." He also accused pro-Palestinian groups, including Jewish Voice for Peace and Students for Justice in Palestine, of being "Iranian proxies".

In October 2024, the ACLU, Amnesty International, and Human Rights Watch wrote a joint statement warning that law enforcement on 20 U.S. college campuses had used potentially excessive force against pro-Palestinian protesters in violation of international law and calling for greater protections.

JewBelong posted billboards near San Diego State University that read, "Remember when college was for losing your virginity, not your mind?" and "Dear colleges, American kids are afraid. Do your job!"

A coalition of over 200 organizations published an open letter expressing support for the protests. Signatories include:

- 350.org
- Al-Haq
- Alliance of Baptists
- American Baptist Churches USA
- American Friends Service Committee
- American-Arab Anti-Discrimination Committee
- Arab American Institute
- Beyt Tikkun
- Center for Constitutional Rights
- Council on American-Islamic Relations
- Dream Defenders
- Fight for the Future
- Future Coalition
- Gen-Z for Change
- Greenpeace USA
- Highlander Research and Education Center
- Hindus for Human Rights
- IfNotNow
- Indian American Muslim Council
- Poverty Project at the Institute for Policy Studies
- Islamic Society of North America
- Jews for Racial and Economic Justice
- Jewish Voice for Peace
- Just Foreign Policy
- Justice Democrats
- Mondoweiss
- Movement for Black Lives
- National Iranian American Council
- National Lawyers Guild
- North American Students of Cooperation
- Oakland Institute
- Our Revolution
- Palestine Legal
- Pax Christi USA
- Peace Action
- People’s Action
- Presbyterian Church (USA) Office of Public Witness
- Presbyterian Peace Fellowship
- Progressive Democrats of America
- Project South
- Public Accountability Initiative
- Rising Tide North America
- RootsAction Education Fund
- Sabeel Ecumenical Liberation Theology Center
- Sisters of Charity of Saint Elizabeth
- Starr King School for the Ministry
- Sunrise Movement
- Transnational Institute
- Unitarian Universalist Association
- Unitarian Universalist Service Committee
- US Campaign for Palestinian Rights
- Veterans For Peace
- Women’s Institute for Freedom of the Press
- Working Families Party
- World Beyond War
- Young Democrats of America Black Caucus

==== Political ====
On April 22, President Joe Biden criticized and condemned the protests, calling them antisemitic and criticizing those who "don't understand what's going on with the Palestinians". Former President Donald Trump said that the 2017 white supremacist rally in Charlottesville, Virginia, was "peanuts" compared to the ongoing protests. Speaking at Columbia on April 24, House Speaker Mike Johnson said, "Congress will not be silent as Jewish students are expected to run for their lives and stay home from their classes hiding in fear." Senate Majority Leader Chuck Schumer condemned "lawlessness" during the protests at Columbia, calling it "unacceptable when Jewish students are targeted for being Jewish, when protests exhibit verbal abuse, systematic intimidation or glorification of the murderous and hateful Hamas or the violence of Oct. 7."

Florida Governor Ron DeSantis described the situation at Columbia and other campuses as "inmates run[ning] the asylum." Texas Governor Greg Abbott said that the protesters "belonged in jail" and continued to claim that the protests were "hate-filled, antisemitic protests" and that anyone engaging in them should be expelled. Pennsylvania Governor Josh Shapiro criticized colleges and universities that did not do enough to protect its students, which could lead to antisemitic incidents. Senate Republican leader Mitch McConnell called the protests "a dangerous situation" and said, "there's also antisemitism, which is completely unacceptable". He accused the "student radicals" of supporting Hamas. Multiple conservative politicians and commentators, including Mike Johnson, Ted Cruz, Ira Stoll, Isabel Vincent, and Kari Lake spread the antisemitic conspiracy theory that George Soros funded the protest movement.

After the mass arrests at UT on April 24, many voiced their disapproval over Abbott's handling of the decision and the police tactics. Texas Democrats said that Abbott's Department of Public Safety had "more courage to arrest peaceful student protesters than when an active shooter entered an elementary school in Uvalde." U.S. representative Alexandria Ocasio-Cortez also criticized the deployment of police against the Columbia University protest, calling it an "escalatory, reckless, and dangerous act". Irvine, California Mayor Farrah Khan said: "I am asking our law enforcement to stand down. I will not tolerate any violations to our students' rights to peacefully assemble and protest."

The Fairfax County branch of the Democratic Party issued a statement denouncing the arrests of students at Virginia schools. Virginia representatives Rozia Henson, Joshua Cole, Adele McClure, Nadarius Clark, and Saddam Salim released a joint statement condemning the arrests of student protesters in Virginia. After visiting the encampment at the University of Pennsylvania, Philadelphia District Attorney Larry Krasner said: "The First Amendment comes from here. This is Philadelphia. We don't have to do stupid like they did at Columbia". California representative Sara Jacobs wrote on X: "I'm deeply concerned that the response to peaceful protests at UCSD is to call in riot police. A militarized response further escalates the situation and doesn't help keep students safe."

Addressing students at the City University of New York on April 26, imprisoned Black political activist Mumia Abu-Jamal praised the protests, saying, "It is a wonderful thing that you have decided not to be silent and decided to speak out against the repression that you see with your own eyes", calling protesters "on the right side of history". College Democrats of America, the student wing of the Democratic Party, endorsed the protests and criticized Biden's response to them. Massachusetts State Representative Mike Connolly said: "I'm here really in solidarity with these protesters, and I'm hoping that the MIT administration will honor free speech and will honor the tradition of dissents in this country, in particular dissents to war, which is what really calls us here today."

On May 12, Trump said, "[Biden] is surrendering our college campuses to anarchists, jihadist freaks and anti-American extremists who are trying to tear down our American flag. ... If you come here from another country and try to bring jihadism or anti-Americanism or antisemitism to our campuses, we will immediately deport you. You'll be out of that school." On May 14, Trump told a room full of donors he would deport foreign student demonstrators. According to anonymous Trump donors, Trump said that protests were part of a "revolutionary movement" and that "if you get me reelected, we're going to set that movement back 25 or 30 years."

For legal scholar Shirin Sinnar, the repression of campus protests from university administrators in the 2023–24 academic year facilitated authoritarianism under the Trump administration, arguing that the "failure to rebut politicized narratives that pro-Palestine protests were rampant with violence, antisemitism, and lawlessness has made it harder for academic institutions to resist the even greater weaponization of such caricatures now." Sinnar adds:

The denunciation of these protests as violating the norms of civil disobedience, based on simplistic understandings of theories of civil disobedience, has made it easier to cast student protestors as agents of chaos and disorder without a moral message and demand on society. It is far easier to punish higher education institutions for permitting protests—and to disappear students from their dorm rooms and the streets—when campus protestors have been vilified over the course of more than a year. The new speech and protest policies that many colleges and universities adopted, even before the Trump administration returned to power, challenged the rule of law within these institutions, whether viewed in formalist, substantive, governance, or procedural terms. Having ceded so much ground already, it is a small step for some colleges and universities to acquiesce entirely to the relentless threats now levied against them. Such acquiescence will not only undermine these institutions' missions of research and teaching, but also undercut their ability to act as an independent preserve of inquiry and dissent in the face of mounting authoritarianism.

==== Legislation ====
On April 23, the California State Senate Judiciary Committee passed 2024 SB-1287 on a 10–0 vote, advancing it to the Senate Appropriations Committee. The bill would require the California State University system and California Community Colleges system to enact policies that would prohibit violence, harassment, intimidation, and discrimination if they are "intended to and reasonably understood by the victims or hearers" to either "interfere with the free exercise of rights under the First Amendment or Section 2 of Article I of the California Constitution" or to "call for or support genocide". The bill would also restrict the right to assemble on campuses with "reasonable time, place, and manner restrictions, including advance authorization provisions, for public protests and demonstrations at institutions." The bill has received support exclusively from Jewish and Zionist organizations. It is opposed by the ACLU and the University of California, Davis School of Law, which called the bill unconstitutional.

The "Antisemitism Awareness Act", spearheaded by the Republicans but also backed by many Democrats, passed the United States House of Representatives in a 320–91 vote on May 1, 2024, and proceeded to the Senate. The bill is intended to address the recent perceived rise in antisemitism on campuses and uses the International Holocaust Remembrance Alliance's approved working definition of antisemitism to Title VI of the Civil Rights Act of 1964, which prohibits "exclusion from participation in, denial of benefits of, and discrimination under federally assisted programs on ground of race, color, or national origin." Democratic Representative Sara Jacobs, who is Jewish, said she opposed the bill because "it fails to effectively address the very real rise of antisemitism, all while defunding colleges and universities across the country and punishing many, if not all, of the nonviolent protesters speaking out against the Israeli military's conduct."

The proposed legislation would broaden the legal definition of antisemitism to include anti-Zionism, criticism of the policies of the state of Israel, and concerns about Palestinian human rights, by categorizing all of that as hate speech, and it has been criticized for conflating "Judaism with Zionism in assuming that all Jews are Zionists" and automatic citizens of Israel rather than the U.S., thereby severely undermining genuine safety for Jewish citizens. It faces strong opposition from several Democratic lawmakers, Jewish organizations, and free speech advocates, including more than 800 Jewish U.S. academics, who signed a letter calling on Biden not to sign the bill.

Jeremy Ben-Ami, president of the centrist pro-Israel group J Street, said that his organization opposes the bill because it is an "unserious" effort led by Republicans "to continually force votes that divide the Democratic caucus on an issue that shouldn't be turned into a political football."

The ACLU sees the bill as an attack on First Amendment rights and argues that its "overbroad" definition of antisemitism "could result in colleges and universities suppressing a wide variety of speech critical of Israel or in support of Palestinian rights in an effort to avoid investigations by the Department [of Education] and the potential loss of funding."

Organizations like the Anti-Defamation League and Conference of Presidents have praised the bill, and it is based on definitions by the International Holocaust Remembrance Alliance that have been criticized by 100 Israeli and international civil society organizations that wrote to the United Nations Secretary General Antonio Guterres in 2023 urging the UN not to adopt the definitions.

Three Republican members of the U.S. House introduced a bill that would require anyone convicted of unlawful activity on a college campus to perform community service in Gaza for six months. The bill was widely derided as a political stunt and is exceedingly unlikely to pass.

Legislators in the Virginia House of Delegates and Virginia Senate formed select committees to investigate how state colleges responded to the protests after over 125 people were arrested in the state.

==== Lawsuits ====
On May 15, United Auto Workers (UAW)'s Harvard Graduate Student Union sued Harvard University, accusing it of surveillance and retaliation against workplace-related collective action, denying employees union representation in disciplinary hearings, and unfairly changing policies regarding access to campus to discourage protesters. In October 2024, a federal judge found that Texas Governor Greg Abbott's executive order on preventing antisemitism on campuses likely violated free speech protections.

=== Other countries ===
Israeli Prime Minister Benjamin Netanyahu said the protests were "horrific" and antisemitic and must be quelled. Jewish U.S. Senator Bernie Sanders responded vehemently, accusing Netanyahu of distracting the American people from the Gaza war and expressing support for the protests. Many Israeli academics and civilians, alongside columnists in Israeli media such as The Jerusalem Post and Haaretz, expressed disdain for the protests, with one describing the general reaction as "seeing them as an attack on the country and not just its government".

Canadian Prime Minister Justin Trudeau, Ontario Premier Doug Ford, and Quebec Premier François Legault criticized the protests.

After being invited to visit the Columbia protest, Palestinian photojournalist Motaz Azaiza said his experience was great, that he appreciated students wanting to know more and educate themselves, and that it was an honor to raise awareness about the Gaza Strip. Bisan Owda said the protests made the Gazan populace feel "heard". Displaced people in Gaza expressed gratitude to the student protesters, holding signs such as "Thank you, American universities".

In response to the protests at Columbia, the spokesperson for India's Ministry of External Affairs said, "In every democracy, there has to be the right balance between freedom of expression, sense of responsibility and public safety and order... After all, we are all judged by what we do at home and not what we say abroad." Chinese state media expressed support for the protests: the People's Daily wrote that American students are protesting because they "can no longer stand the double standards of the United States" and former editor-in-chief of the Global Times Hu Xijin said that the protests show that "Jewish political and business alliance's control over American public opinion has declined." According to Microsoft, Chinese Communist Party-linked influence operations online such as Spamouflage have used the protests to stoke outrage. In Iran, former foreign minister Mohammad Javad Zarif criticized Saudi Arabia's and Jordan's reported consideration of normalizing relations with Israel, saying, "American student protesters being brutalised by US security forces have a much greater claim to protecting Palestinians than the Custodians of Holy Mosques". In Tunisia, the General Union of Students released a statement expressing "gratitude and admiration for the student movements at American universities, drawing inspiration from their remarkable history of war rejection, as witnessed during the Vietnam War".

After the three-day occupation at Sciences Po in Paris, Prime Minister of France Gabriel Attal said he would "not tolerate the actions of a dangerously acting minority", calling the protests "an ideology coming from North America". The Latin Patriarch of Jerusalem Cardinal Pierbattista Pizzaballa criticized the protesters' actions, saying, "universities are places where cultural engagement, even heated, even harsh, must be open 360 degrees, where engagement with strong ideas that are completely different, must be expressed not with violence, not with boycotts, but knowing how to engage". After arrests at the Athens Law School, Greek Prime Minister Kyriakos Mitsotakis said that "authorities would not allow universities to become sites for protest over Israel's war on Gaza as has been seen in countries around the world". In support of students' right to protest, European University Institute president Patrizia Nanz accused universities of demanding a "safe space" in order to "justify the repression of students' Gaza protests" and restrict their freedom of speech.

Sanaa University in Yemen offered education to students suspended due to protests. Mohammad Moazzeni, the head of Shiraz University in Iran, has offered scholarships to U.S. students expelled for participating in pro-Palestinian protests. This offer, reported by Press TV, extends to students and professors affected by the protests. Moazzeni suggested that other universities in Shiraz and Fars province may also be prepared to support these students. At the same time, the Israeli Ministry of Diaspora Affairs launched a program aimed at helping Jewish students who feel unsafe at U.S. universities continue their education at Israeli universities.

Iranian leader Ayatollah Ali Khameini has praised the protests on Twitter, praising American students and suggesting they were "on the right side of history". He further described the protesting students as part of the "resistance front" against Israel and encouraged them to "become familiar with the Quran." Iran-based influence networks provided financial assistance, and posed as students, "to stoke student-organized protests", according to American intelligence assessments.

== Opinion polls ==
A May 2024 divestment referendum at DePaul University returned a 91% vote in favor of divestment. In April 2024, Columbia College voted on three divestment questions. The first asked whether Columbia should divest from Israel, the second asked whether it should cancel the Tel Aviv Global Center program, and the third asked whether Columbia should end its dual degree program with Tel Aviv University. The motions passed by 76%, 68%, and 65%, respectively, with 40% voter participation. Students at the University of Pennsylvania voted 73% in favor of disclosing all investments in the school's endowment and 63% in favor of ending the university's relationship with Ghost Robotics, with 22% voter participation.

According to a YouGov poll released on May 3, 2024, 47% of Americans opposed the campus protests and 28% supported them. American Muslims supported the protests by 75% to 14% while Jewish Americans opposed them by 72% to 18%. Adults under 45 were more likely to support them than older adults. 33% believed the response to the protests was not harsh enough, 16% believed it was too harsh, and 20% believed the response was about right. 48% of Americans over 45 believed the response was not harsh enough, compared to only 16% under 45.

According to an Axios poll released on May 7, 2024, 8% of college students participated in the protests. 34% blame Hamas, 19% blame Netanyahu, 12% blame the Israeli people, and 12% blame Biden for the destruction in Gaza. 81% of students supported holding protesters accountable for destroyed property and illegally occupied buildings, 67% considered occupying campus buildings unacceptable, 58% considered refusal to disperse unacceptable, and 90% opposed blocking pro-Israel students. Students were more likely to support the pro-Palestinian encampments, with 45% who supported them strongly or moderately, 30% neutral, and 24% strongly or mildly opposed. Among those who participated in anti-Israeli protests, 58% said they would not be friends with someone who had marched for Israel, while 64% of students who marched in favor of Israel said they would still be friends with anti-Israeli protesters.

In a Data for Progress poll in collaboration with Zeteo released on May 8, 2024, 55% of Democrats, 36% of Republicans, and 46% of all likely voters said they disapproved of colleges limiting students' rights and ability to protest Israel's military operations, whereas 32% of Democrats, 49% of Republicans, and 40% of all likely voters approved of doing so. Overall, 40% approved and 42% disapproved of the protests.

In Canada, 19% of respondents supported the protesters and 48% of respondents opposed the protests.

== See also ==
- Detention of Mahmoud Khalil
- International reactions to the Gaza war
