= The Quants =

2010 book by Scott Patterson

The Quants How a New Breed of Math Whizzes Conquered Wall Street and Nearly Destroyed It
- Hardcover edition
- Author: Scott Patterson
- Language: English
- Subject: Finance, trading, investing
- Genre: Non-fiction
- Publisher: Crown Business
- Publication date: February 2, 2010
- Publication place: United States
- Media type: Print, e-book
- Pages: 352 pp.
- ISBN: 0-307-45337-5
- Followed by: Dark Pools

The Quants is the debut New York Times best selling book by Wall Street journalist Scott Patterson. It was released on February 2, 2010, by Crown Business. The book describes the world of quantitative analysis and the various hedge funds that use the technique. Two years later, Patterson published a follow-up book, Dark Pools: High Speed Traders, AI Bandits and the Threat to the Global Financial System, an investigative journey into the history of high-frequency trading and the spread of artificial intelligence in today's markets.

== Background ==
Patterson began writing The Quants in 2008. He was first exposed to the quantitative analysis investment strategies while covering the financial industry for the Wall Street Journal. As he became more acquainted with the players involved, he found that many of the most successful quants knew each other and carried similar eccentricities. Realizing this was a world that the average investor knew little of, Patterson wrote the book to shed light on the strategies, players, and related risks of such trading strategies.

== Synopsis ==
The introduction to The Quants describes the real-life, annual, high-stakes poker match between Wall Street's hedge fund managers, comparing their trading styles to their poker strategies. It focuses on, among other things, the 2007 subprime mortgage crisis and how it helped trigger a sudden and massive unwinding of complex, highly leveraged quantitative strategies. The book also delves into critical short-comings of many quantitative strategies, such as their tendency to lead to crowded trades and their underestimation of the likelihood of chaotic, volatile moves in the markets.

The book also delves into the background of the various vanguards of quantitative analysis. It tells the history of Beat the Market & Beat the Dealer author Ed Thorp; Pete Muller from Morgan Stanley's hedge fund; Ken Griffin from Chicago's Citadel LLC; James Simons from Renaissance Technologies; Clifford S. Asness and Aaron Brown from AQR Capital Management; and Boaz Weinstein from Deutsche Bank.

== Reception ==
The Quants debuted on The New York Times bestseller list. Jon Stewart featured Patterson as a guest on The Daily Show and described the book as "unbelievable." Patterson was a guest on NPR, and Ed Thorp, one of the book's main characters, joined Patterson for a live interview. The New York Times profiled the book, calling it "fascinating and deeply disturbing." The Quants received additional profiles in Bloomberg, BusinessWeek, Scientific American, Financial Times, and Minyanville.

== See also ==
- More Money Than God (2010), a financial book by Sebastian Mallaby
- The Big Short (2010) by Michael Lewis
