= Quant (surname) =

Quant /kwɒnt/ is a surname. Notable people with the surname include:

- Abbie de Quant (born 1946), Dutch flautist
- Fritz Quant (1888–1933), German painter, graphic artist, and designer
- Jonas Quant (born 1973), Swedish record producer, songwriter, and remixer
- Mary Quant (1930–2023), English fashion designer and fashion icon
