= Palestine Writes =

Palestinian cultural and literary festival

- Formation: 2020
- Purpose: Celebrating and promoting cultural productions of Palestinian writers and artists
- Headquarters: Yardley, PA
- Key people: Susan Abulhawa (executive director)
- Website: https://palestinewrites.org/

Palestine Writes, founded as Palestine Writes Back, is a festival that presents Palestinian culture and literature. The festival, which claims to be the largest celebration of Palestinian literature and culture in North America, was first held 2020.

The festival was originally scheduled in March 2020, but was virtually presented in December 2020 due to the pandemic, with an attendance of more than 3000 people. Organizers explicitly aimed to include both Palestinians and non-Palestinians "to imagine a world we want". Among others, it was sponsored by the Lannan Foundation, the Rockefeller Brothers Fund, and the Columbia University Center for Palestine Studies.

In September 2023, Palestine Writes took place on the campus of the University of Pennsylvania. Programming included oral storytelling, graphic novels, dress-making, and other displays of Palestinian culture. The event featured more than 100 pro-Palestinian speakers. It was criticized by the Anti-Defamation League and the Jewish Federation of Greater Philadelphia based on the participation of speakers accused of antisemitism, notably Roger Waters. The organizers categorically rejected these accusations, asserting that criticism of Israel should not be equated with antisemitism.

The criticism of the festival intensified following the October 2023 Hamas-led attack on Israel.
