= Minyanville =

Internet financial media company

Minyanville Media, Inc.
- Type: Private C-Corp
- Industry: Online Publishing and Multimedia; Financial News & Commentary; Financial Education
- Founded: 2002
- Founder: Todd Harrison
- Fate: Bought by T3 Live, 2014
- Headquarters: Manhattan, New York

Minyanville Media, Inc. was an Internet-based financial media and publishing company.

Investment and business articles and broadcasts were available directly on its website, and via licensing agreements with major financial websites that include Yahoo Finance, MSN Money, AOL Money & Finance and MarketWatch. More than 40 financial professionals publish bylined articles on Minyanville; the company also provides subscription publications with market-specific analysis. Its website receives some 1,000,000 Unique Visitors per month, and is in the top 4,000 websites in the U.S. Minyanville's content has earned an Emmy for Business and Financial Reporting for its web show "Minyanville's World in Review with Hoofy and Boo".

Minyanville was started in 2002 by Todd Harrison, who had been a trader, fund manager, and senior executive on Wall Street, with such firms as Morgan Stanley and Galleon Group. In July 2000, Harrison's first financial column appeared on TheStreet.com, which he wrote as a favour for a former colleague who was going on vacation. Harrison says his bearish commentary on tech stocks resonated with readers, and he soon became a featured columnist.

In May 2014, Todd Harrison announced he was "looking for a new business model" stating the online media model was 'broken', and was putting Minyanville up for sale. Not necessarily to a competing media outfit, but ideally to a financial institution. Harrison was looking to turn Minyanville into an outlet that isn't depending on ads or chasing web traffic purely for traffic's sake

Later in 2014, Minyanville was acquired by T3Live, the digital content and reader community absorbed there and the website shut down.
