= AQR Capital Management =

Global investment management firm

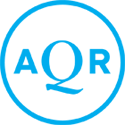

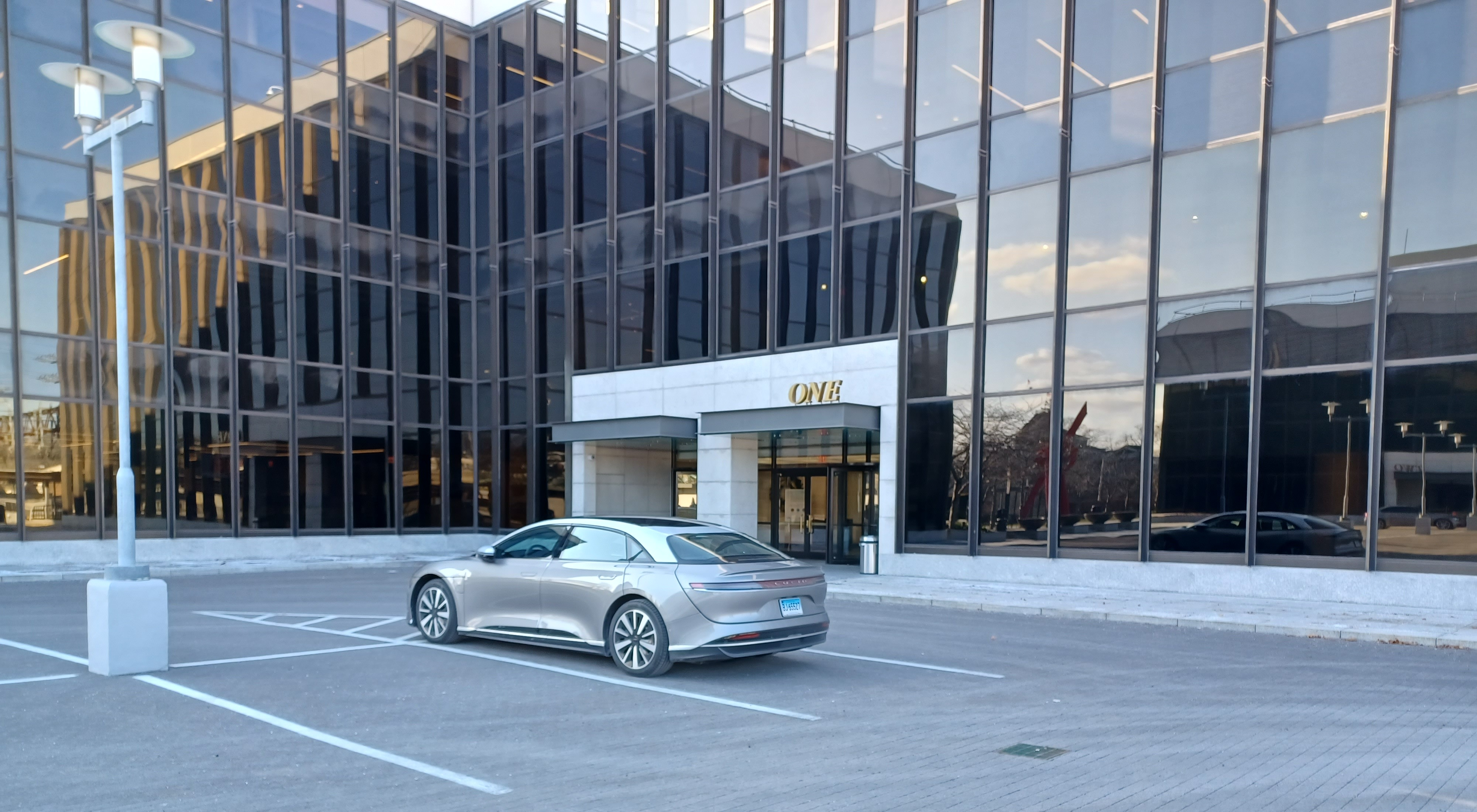
- Location of AQR Capital's offices in Greenwich, Connecticut
- Type: LLC
- Industry: Hedge fund; Financial services
- Founded: January 1998; 28 years ago
- Founders: Cliff Asness; David Kabiller; John Liew; Robert Krail
- Headquarters: Greenwich, Connecticut, USA
- Area served: Worldwide
- Key people: Cliff Asness (Managing Principal)
- AUM: $99 billion (Q4 2023)
- Number of employees: 573 (2023)
- Website: aqr.com

AQR Capital Management (short for Applied Quantitative Research) is a global investment management firm based in Greenwich, Connecticut, United States. The firm, which was founded in 1998 by Cliff Asness, David Kabiller, John Liew, and Robert Krail, offers a variety of quantitatively driven alternative and traditional investment vehicles to both institutional clients and financial advisors. The firm is primarily owned by its founders and principals. AQR has additional offices in Bengaluru, Hong Kong, London, Sydney, Munich and Dubai.

== Investment philosophy and strategies ==
AQR employs a research-based "systematic and consistent approach" to portfolio construction. This disciplined approach of identifying long-term, repeatable sources of return means "having a high conviction in the process, but not a high conviction in any particular stock". The firm is a strong proponent of diversification within portfolios, as well as adding strategies with low correlation to traditional asset classes as a complement to existing portfolios.

AQR was an early adopter of style, or factor, investing given the strategy's academic roots. Although the four styles — value, momentum, defensive and carry — have been well-known and used in quantitative investing for decades, AQR has long advocated for using these styles together, citing their diversifying qualities.

AQR is perhaps best known for its alternative investment strategies, which aim to offer low correlation to traditional, equity-dominated portfolios. AQR was one of the first investment managers to offer a risk parity strategy, which aims to balance allocations based on underlying risk rather than asset classes. The firm also offers managed futures, a trend-following strategy that is “uncorrelated with other asset classes” and supported by over a century of academic evidence.

AQR was one of the first investment management firms to offer alternative mutual funds, launching its family of mutual funds in 2009. The firm's liquid alternative strategies were a “category leader” in Morningstar’s ranking for 2015.

== History ==
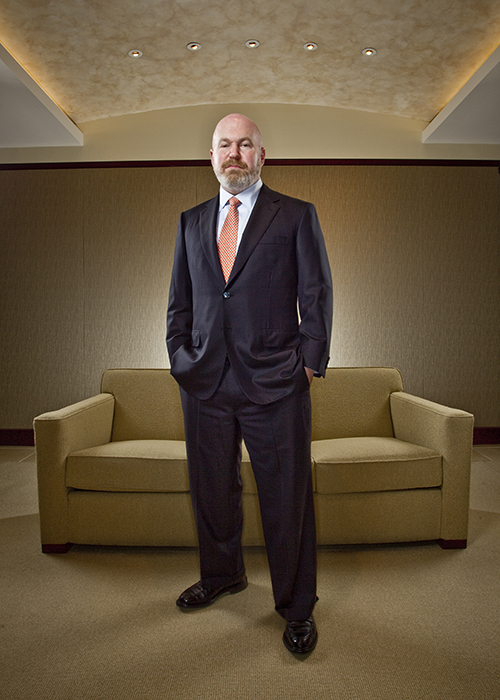
Cliff Asness in 2010

Three of AQR's founding principals — Cliff Asness, Robert Krail and John Liew — met in the University of Chicago’s PhD program, where the foundation of the firm's investment philosophy took shape.

While still working on his dissertation, which focused on momentum and value, Asness joined Goldman Sachs, where he was asked to lead a new quantitative research team within the firm's asset management division. Liew and Krail joined him, and the new team applied what they learned in academia to manage both hedge-fund and long-only assets.

In 1998, Asness, David Kabiller, Krail and Liew left Goldman Sachs to establish AQR.

AQR was among the first hedge fund managers to voluntarily register at its inception with the United States Securities and Exchange Commission. The firm's first product was a hedge fund, though it soon (2000) entered into traditional portfolio management. In 2001, AQR had nearly $750 million assets under management. In 2004, AQR had $12 billion assets under management. The firm opened its first international office in Australia in 2005.

In 2009, AQR became one of the first investment managers to offer alternative mutual funds. In 2011, the firm opened an office in the UK.

After AQR's annual profit plunged 34% in 2018, the firm announced job cuts in January 2019.

As of Q3 2019, the firm had $185 billion in assets under management.

== Assets under management ==
Year	AUM in billions US$
2009	20
2015	23
2017	224
2018	193
2020	143
2025	128

== Ties to academia ==
As of 2016, approximately half of the AQR's employees have earned advanced degrees, with 52 holding PhDs.

In 2015, AQR established QUANTA Academy, the firm's learning and development program, which is focused on three core pillars: Technical Skills and Knowledge, Leadership and Management, and Personal Enrichment. With a focus on lifelong learning, the program is designed to help employees reach their full potential through hundreds of courses annually.

AQR's Insight Award (see below), which “recognizes the most significant and innovative academic research that offers practical applications for investors,” awarded its fifth annual slate of winners in 2016.

In 2014, AQR partnered with the London Business School to establish The AQR Asset Management Institute, which focuses on asset management research and thought leadership. The Institute rewards scholars in the field with annual grants and prizes. AQR donated more than $15 million to be spread out over ten years.

The firm is also a sponsor of the AQR Top Finance Graduate Award at Copenhagen Business School, which honors the PhD graduates whose research carries the greatest potential impact.
