= Reuven Brenner =

Canadian economist

- Born: Romania

Academic background
- Education: Hebrew University

Academic work
- Institutions: McGill University

Reuven Brenner (Hebrew: ראובן ברנר; born 1947) is a Romanian-born Israeli-Canadian economics professor, holding the REPAP Chair of Economics at McGill University's Desautels Faculty of Management.

== Notability ==
Forbes magazine has called the professor one of "six economists every entrepreneur should Know". Additionally, Asia Times praised him for creating a model that makes real world sense.

== Career ==
Over the last thirty years he has consulted for companies including Bank of America, Knowledge Universe, Bell Canada. The son of concentration camp survivors, he was born in 1947 in Romania, and immigrated to Israel where he served in the Israeli Army during both the Six-Day War and Yom Kippur War

At the core of his economic model is the view that the metaphysical trumps the physical, with human capital the source of true wealth creation around the world. Physical wealth, as in wealth that comes from the ground is not portable, which means it can easily be taxed, or worse, expropriated. His most recent book, A World of Chance argues that at one time gambling fulfilled roles performed by venture capital and banking today, and that modern financial institutions retain a strong gambling core. The book shows how people dealt with uncertainty and risk since antiquity; how they rationalized a variety of beliefs and institutions that made it appear that decisions had some solid backing; and how people in fact made decisions on a variety of issues linked to finance, gambling, insurance, religion and politics.

In his 2002 book, Force of Finance, Brenner notes that economic success in certain countries often results from "political blunders of other nations," that lead "to the rapid outflow of both capital and talented people." The book also discusses the various monetary policy options, pointing out the flaws in inflation rate targeting and floating exchange rates, and suggests that economists have misunderstood the proper role of gold. Brenner also integrates his views about democratization of capital markets and entrepreneurship with issues such as nationalism and tolerance, as well as with details about political institutions that can best maintain accountability, illustrating the latter with Swiss' unique "direct democracy."

In addition to Force of Finance, Reuven Brenner is the author of seven other books. Labyrinths of Prosperity helps to explain among other things why the Dutch are seen as frugal, why education spending rose in the United States after 1958, and why Russians refrained from buying apartments there after the U.S.S.R.'s collapse. For the macro-focused, he points out that statistics such as GDP sustain "the illusion that prosperity is necessarily linked with territory, national units, and government spending in general."

In Gambling and Speculation Brenner makes an argument for gambling legalization. He uses history and theory to cover measures of risk taking, noting that risk-taking that is a daily part our lives.

In Educating Economists, Brenner and co-author David Colander discuss ways to improve the training of future economists. In the chapter Making Sense out of Nonsense, Brenner discusses what's wrong with the social sciences and academia today, and in two other chapters focusing on the main courses being taught in economics either being empty of content, or wrong. Rivalry: In Business, Science, Among Nations posits a theory of business enterprise that suggests risks are taken as a way to be outranked by one's peers in the hierarchical sense. The book also deals with antitrust, state owned enterprises, and advertising, showing how the latter saves significant search costs, and how recommendations of family and friends (the non-digital ones of the 1980s) were a good substitute for advertising.

His first two books, History: The Human Gamble and Betting on Ideas present his views on "history," by looking at facts and sequence of events that other historians and social scientists have not, and integrates Brenner's views of human nature, of experimenting with innovations in business, science, politics, with demographic changes.

In addition to his books, Brenner's articles have been published in The Wall Street Journal, Forbes, American Affairs, National Post (Canada), Financial Times, The Straits Times (Singapore), Asia Times, Dow Jones and Le Figaro (Paris). He also has a column at Forbes.

== Selected additional articles ==
- Brenner, Reuven. "Leapfrogging". Forbes column.https://www.forbes.com/sites/leapfrogging/archive/#618e168f7d9b
- Brenner, Reuven (2003). "Oiling the Wheels of a Tribal Society". Asia Times.https://www.globalpolicy.org/component/content/article/168/36893.html
- Brenner, Reuven (2004). "Unsettled Civilizations". Asia Times.https://www.iedm.org/fr/2413-unsettled-civilizations-how-the-us-can-handle-iraq/11/
- Brenner, Reuven (2012). "Eurozone Bonds: Learning from Pre-Nuptial Agreements". AEI. https://www.aei.org/articles/eurozone-bonds-learning-from-pre-nuptial-agreements/
- Brenner, Reuven (2012). "The 1930s All Over Again?". AEI. https://www.aei.org/articles/the-1930s-all-over-again/
- Brenner, Reuven (2013). "Accelerated Learning Would Add Trillions of Dollars in Wealth". AEI. https://www.aei.org/articles/accelerated-learning-would-add-trillions-of-dollars-in-wealth/
- Brenner, Reuven (2016). "Prohibiting the Pursuit of Happiness". John Paul II Institute. https://www.kas.de/c/document_library/get_file?uuid=542727e1-3a64-b018-8b70-2c11a660be48&groupId=252038
- Brenner, Reuven (2016). "How to Make an Innovation Policy Effective?” ". Speech at Presidential Palace, Warsaw 7 June 2016, reprinted by Konrad Adenauer Center https://www.kas.de/c/document_library/get_file?uuid=79998627-4ba9-c59a-e956-f0065793af8f&groupId=252038
- Brenner, Reuven (2017). "Dismiss Macroeconomic Myths and Restore Accountability". American Affairs. https://americanaffairsjournal.org/2017/02/dismiss-macroeconomic-myths-restore-accountability/
- Brenner, Reuven (2017). "Toward a New Bretton Woods Agreement". American Affairs. https://americanaffairsjournal.org/2017/05/toward-new-bretton-woods-agreement/
- Brenner, Reuven (2017). "Accelerated Education". American Affairs. https://americanaffairsjournal.org/2017/11/accelerate-education/
- Brenner, Reuven (2019). "How to Relink Seven Billion People?". American Affairs. https://americanaffairsjournal.org/2019/11/how-to-relink-seven-billion-people/
- Brenner, Reuven (2019). "The Financial Crisis Ten Years Later". American Affairs. https://americanaffairsjournal.org/2017/05/toward-new-bretton-woods-agreement/
- Brenner, Reuven (2018). "The Roots of Anti Semitism". Wall Street Journal.https://www.wsj.com/articles/the-roots-of-anti-semitism-1525992673
