= Scott Patterson (author) =

American business journalist (born 1969)

- Born: December 29, 1969 (age 55)
- Occupation(s): Journalist, author

Scott Patterson (born December 29, 1969) is an American financial journalist and bestselling author. He is a staff reporter at The Wall Street Journal and author of Dark Pools: High-Speed Traders, A.I. Bandits, and the Threat to the Global Financial System and The New York Times bestselling book The Quants.

== Journalism ==
Patterson has as Master of Arts and English degree from James Madison University. Patterson is a staff reporter at The Wall Street Journal covering government regulation of the financial industry. His coverage has included high-profile interviews with Mark Cuban, Warren Buffett, Edward Thorp and others.

He has been described as the "go-to guy" for high-tech journalism, covering topics such as dark pools, flash crashes, algorithmic trading and high-frequency trading (HFT).

Patterson is an active critic of high-frequency trading, citing HFT as a major cause of market volatility and preferential treatment of select firms, yet acknowledging HFT role as market makers. He advocates for greater government oversight of the markets, arguing that regulatory systems have not kept pace with Wall Street innovation. He cites this gap as a key factor in the decline of public confidence in the markets. Patterson attributes the Flash Crash to a combination of all these issues.

== Books ==
=== The Quants ===
In 2010, Patterson wrote The Quants: How a New Breed of Math Whizzes Conquered Wall Street and Nearly Destroyed It, a bestseller that was published by Crown Publishing. The book outlines computer-driven quantitative trading by following the lives of four "quants." These quants are highly educated whiz kids that created complex mathematical algorithms to exploit market inefficiencies.

Ultimately, the reliance on computer-driven trading was attributed to meltdowns such as Black Monday, the collapse of Long-Term Capital Management, and Great Credit Crackup. The history of quantitative trading is covered, including early quants such as Edward Thorp and how much of the early knowledge was applied from lessons learned at blackjack tables. The book also highlights interactions with people against quantitative trading including Nassim Nicholas Taleb, author of Black Swan.

=== Dark Pools ===
On June 12, 2012, Patterson released Dark Pools: High-Speed Traders, A.I. Bandits, and the Threat to the Global Financial System. The book expands on The Quants to show how the rise of algorithmic trading, artificial intelligence bots, and high-frequency trading have rigged the current stock market. Patterson also discusses how governmental agencies, like the SEC, cannot keep up with the rapid evolution of technology.

These new innovations show no sign of slowing, and Patterson describes AI Bots, Dark Pools, and HFT as the future of trading.

The Globe and Mail described Dark Pools as "the best book going on the issue."

== Reception ==
Patterson's debut book The Quants went on to become a New York Times Bestseller. Due to the success of the first book, Patterson began working on Dark Pools to expand on the issues covered in The Quants.

Patterson's style of writing has been compared to author Michael Lewis, due to his ability to relay complex financial topics in a way suitable for mass appeal. His journalism has been praised for its depth, particularly in cataloging the roots of current market technologies. Patterson's work has been featured in The Wall Street Journal, New York Times, CNBC, Forbes, CNN, Fortune magazine, Rolling Stone, Scientific American, and the Financial Times, among others.
