= Vašíček =

Vašíček (feminine: Vašíčková) is a Czech surname. It is a diminutive of the given name Václav. Notable people with the surname include:

- Caroline Vasicek (born 1974), Austrian actress
- Jiří Vašíček (born 1980), Czech ice hockey player
- John Vasicek (born 1974), American filmmaker
- Josef Vašíček (1980–2011), Czech ice hockey player
- Oldřich Vašíček (born 1942), Czech mathematician
- Václav Vašíček (born 1991), Czech footballer
- Vic Vasicek (1926–2003), American football player
- Vladimír Vašíček (1919–2003), Czech painter
- Vojtěch Vašíček (1956–2024), Czech paralympic athlete and table tennis player

== See also ==
- Vasicek model, a mathematical model named after Oldřich Vašíček
