= Constant dollar plan =

Stock market investment plan

Constant Dollar Plan is a portfolio investment plan where a simple variable ratio is used for rebalancing investments. The constant ratio plan was one of the first plans devised when institutions started to invest in the stock market in the 1940s. One type of plan is called a "variable ratio plan". There are several ways of executing these plans. The simplest variable ratio plan is called the Constant Dollar Plan where you take a simple ratio between asset classes and rebalance it as the value of the stocks change based on a fixed currency amount.

== Example ==
One possible scenario (Note: extremely optimistic, for illustration purposes only) is an investor with $10,000 to invest. He invests half into stocks, and the other half into bonds or a money market fund. If his shares cost $10.00, he invested $5,000.00, so he has 500 shares. Later after a market move, he finds his shares are valued at $3.00 a share, so he has lost 70% of his stock portfolio. He now transfers $3,500 into the stock portfolio, in order to bring the value back to $5,000.00. He now has 1,666 shares. Later, the market recovers and his shares are now valued at $10.00 a share. His shares are now worth $16,660; he sells $11,660 and puts the proceeds into his bond portfolio. He now has $5,000 in the stock market and $13,160 in bonds.

=== Analyses ===
"The most prominent aspect of this plan is the ease of execution. ... An investor is always certain about [their] fixed exposure to equities."

"In any period when stock prices go up and down, or down and up, and then return to the level at which they started, a Constant Dollar Fund will produce more capital gain than a Constant Ratio operation, assuming that both accounts hold the same amount of stocks at the beginning. It works out this way because, when there are profits, the entire gain is protected in the Constant Dollar Fund, whereas only part of it is transferred to the defensive side when a Constant Ratio is used. … For the same reason, a Constant Dollar Fund is a less profitable type of formula in a period marked by steadily rising [stock] prices."

== See also ==
- Asset allocation
- Buy and hold
- Constant proportion portfolio insurance
- Dollar cost averaging
- Merton's portfolio problem
