= Stochastic modelling (insurance) =

Probability modelling tool

This page is concerned with the stochastic modelling as applied to the insurance industry. For other stochastic modelling applications, please see Monte Carlo method and Stochastic asset models. For mathematical definition, please see Stochastic process.

"Stochastic" means being or having a random variable. A stochastic model is a tool for estimating probability distributions of potential outcomes by allowing for random variation in one or more inputs over time. The random variation is usually based on fluctuations observed in historical data for a selected period using standard time-series techniques. Distributions of potential outcomes are derived from a large number of simulations (stochastic projections) which reflect the random variation in the input(s).

Its application initially started in physics. It is now being applied in engineering, life sciences, social sciences, and finance. See also Economic capital.

== Valuation ==
Like any other company, an insurer has to show that its assets exceeds its liabilities to be solvent. In the insurance industry, however, assets and liabilities are not known entities. They depend on how many policies result in claims, inflation from now until the claim, investment returns during that period, and so on.

So the valuation of an insurer involves a set of projections, looking at what is expected to happen, and thus coming up with the best estimate for assets and liabilities, and therefore for the company's level of solvency.

== Deterministic approach ==
The simplest way of doing this, and indeed the primary method used, is to look at best estimates.

The projections in financial analysis usually use the most likely rate of claim, the most likely investment return, the most likely rate of inflation, and so on. The projections in engineering analysis usually use both the most likely rate and the most critical rate. The result provides a point estimate - the best single estimate of what the company's current solvency position is, or multiple points of estimate - depends on the problem definition. Selection and identification of parameter values are frequently a challenge to less experienced analysts.

The downside of this approach is it does not fully cover the fact that there is a whole range of possible outcomes and some are more probable and some are less.

== Stochastic modelling ==
A stochastic model would be to set up a projection model which looks at a single policy, an entire portfolio or an entire company. But rather than setting investment returns according to their most likely estimate, for example, the model uses random variations to look at what investment conditions might be like.

Based on a set of random variables, the experience of the policy/portfolio/company is projected, and the outcome is noted. Then this is done again with a new set of random variables. In fact, this process is repeated thousands of times.

At the end, a distribution of outcomes is available which shows not only the most likely estimate but what ranges are reasonable too. The most likely estimate is given by the distribution curve's (formally known as the Probability density function) center of mass which is typically also the peak(mode) of the curve, but may be different e.g. for asymmetric distributions.

This is useful when a policy or fund provides a guarantee, e.g. a minimum investment return of 5% per annum. A deterministic simulation, with varying scenarios for future investment return, does not provide a good way of estimating the cost of providing this guarantee. This is because it does not allow for the volatility of investment returns in each future time period or the chance that an extreme event in a particular time period leads to an investment return less than the guarantee. Stochastic modelling builds volatility and variability (randomness) into the simulation and therefore provides a better representation of real life from more angles.

== Numerical evaluations of quantities ==
Stochastic models help to assess the interactions between variables, and are useful tools to numerically evaluate quantities, as they are usually implemented using Monte Carlo simulation techniques (see Monte Carlo method). While there is an advantage here, in estimating quantities that would otherwise be difficult to obtain using analytical methods, a disadvantage is that such methods are limited by computing resources as well as simulation error. Below are some examples:

=== Means ===
Using statistical notation, it is a well-known result that the mean of a function, f, of a random variable X is not necessarily the function of the mean of X.

For example, in application, applying the best estimate (defined as the mean) of investment returns to discount a set of cash flows will not necessarily give the same result as assessing the best estimate to the discounted cash flows.

A stochastic model would be able to assess this latter quantity with simulations.

=== Percentiles ===
This idea is seen again when one considers percentiles (see percentile). When assessing risks at specific percentiles, the factors that contribute to these levels are rarely at these percentiles themselves. Stochastic models can be simulated to assess the percentiles of the aggregated distributions.

=== Truncations and censors ===
Truncating and censoring of data can also be estimated using stochastic models. For instance, applying a non-proportional reinsurance layer to the best estimate losses will not necessarily give us the best estimate of the losses after the reinsurance layer. In a simulated stochastic model, the simulated losses can be made to "pass through" the layer and the resulting losses assessed appropriately.

== The asset model ==
Although the text above referred to "random variations", the stochastic model does not just use any arbitrary set of values. The asset model is based on detailed studies of how markets behave, looking at averages, variations, correlations, and more.

The models and underlying parameters are chosen so that they fit historical economic data, and are expected to produce meaningful future projections.

There are many such models, including the Wilkie Model, the Thompson Model and the Falcon Model.

== The claims model ==
The claims arising from policies or portfolios that the company has written can also be modelled using stochastic methods. This is especially important in the general insurance sector, where the claim severities can have high uncertainties.

=== Frequency-Severity models ===
Depending on the portfolios under investigation, a model can simulate all or some of the following factors stochastically:

- Number of claims
- Claim severities
- Timing of claims

Claims inflations can be applied, based on the inflation simulations that are consistent with the outputs of the asset model, as are dependencies between the losses of different portfolios.

The relative uniqueness of the policy portfolios written by a company in the general insurance sector means that claims models are typically tailor-made.

=== Stochastic reserving models ===
Estimating future claims liabilities might also involve estimating the uncertainty around the estimates of claim reserves.

See J Li's article "Comparison of Stochastic Reserving Models" (published in the Australian Actuarial Journal, volume 12 issue 4) for a recent article on this topic.
