= Maziar Raissi =

American applied mathematician

- Alma mater: University of Maryland, College Park (PhD); George Mason University (PhD)
- Known for: Physics-informed neural networks Hidden fluid mechanics
- Awards: ICBS Frontiers of Science Award
- Scientific career
- Fields: Applied mathematics, machine learning
- Workplaces: University of California, Riverside; University of Colorado Boulder; Nvidia; Brown University
- Website: maziarraissi.github.io

Maziar Raissi is an applied mathematician and associate professor of applied mathematics at the University of California, Riverside. He is known for introducing physics-informed neural networks (PINNs), a method that trains neural networks to satisfy partial differential equations; he is the first author of the 2017 and 2019 papers that described the method, written at Brown University.

== Education ==
Raissi received a PhD in mathematics from George Mason University in 2013 with the dissertation "Multi-fidelity Stochastic Collocation Methods Using Model Reduction Techniques", advised by Padmanabhan Seshaiyer, and a PhD in applied mathematics & statistics, and scientific computation from the University of Maryland, College Park in 2016 with the dissertation "Conic Economics", advised by Dilip Madan.

== Career ==
After his doctorate, Raissi was a postdoctoral research associate and then research assistant professor in the Division of Applied Mathematics at Brown University (2016–2018). He then worked as a senior software engineer at Nvidia (2018–2020), and was an assistant professor of applied mathematics at the University of Colorado Boulder (2020–2023). He joined UC Riverside in 2023 and is an associate professor of mathematics there.

== Research ==
In 2017 Raissi, Perdikaris and Karniadakis described physics-informed neural networks, in which the governing equations of a physical system are included in the loss function of a neural network through automatic differentiation. The 2019 Journal of Computational Physics paper describing the method received a Frontiers of Science Award at the 2023 International Congress of Basic Science.

In 2020 Raissi, Alireza Yazdani and Karniadakis published "Hidden fluid mechanics" in Science, a method that infers velocity and pressure fields from visualizations of a flow such as smoke or dye.

He is a named inventor on US Patent 10,963,540 for physics-informed machine learning, assigned to Brown University.

== Awards ==
- Frontiers of Science Award, International Congress of Basic Science (2023 award cycle).
