= Moody's Analytics =

American analytics and financial services company

Moody's
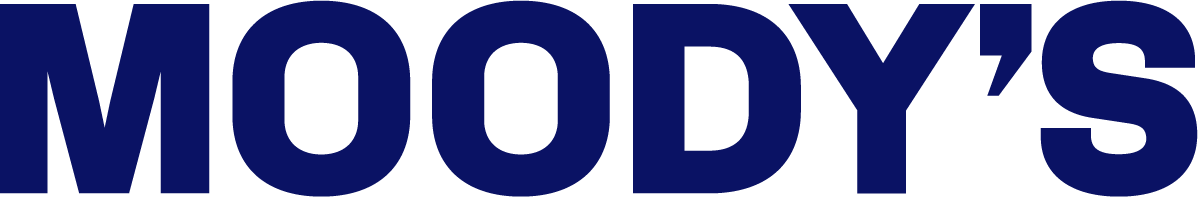
- Formerly: Moody's Analytics (2007–2024)
- Type: Subsidiary
- Industry: Financial services
- Founded: 2007; 19 years ago
- Headquarters: 7 World Trade Center; New York City, New York, U.S.
- Services: Credit analysis, Financial risk management
- Revenue: $3.6 billion
- Number of employees: 10,600
- Parent: Moody's Corporation
- Website: moodysanalytics.com

Moody's, previously known as Moody's Analytics, is a subsidiary of Moody's Corporation established in 2007 to focus on non-rating activities, separate from Moody's Investors Service. It provides economic research regarding risk, performance and financial modeling, as well as consulting, training and software services. Moody's is composed of divisions such as Moody's KMV, Moody's Economy.com, Moody's Wall Street Analytics, the Institute of Risk Standards and Qualifications, and Canadian Securities Institute Global Education Inc.

== History ==
In 1995, Moody's Corporation started a business unit providing quantitative analysis services, including credit risk assessment software and services after acquiring Financial Proformas, Inc., called Moody's Risk Management Service (MRMS).

In early 2000, Moody's acquired the Software Products Group of Crowe, Chizek & Co., then the eighth-largest accounting and consulting firm in the U.S., which brought software used by banks to analyze the risk in taking on commercial loans. The same year, MRMS partnered with RiskMetrics to develop software that combined credit risk analysis with portfolio management.

In February 2002, Moody's purchased KMV (Kealhofer, McQuown and Vasicek), a San Francisco-based quantitative risk management firm, and merged it with MRMS to create Moody's KMV. The company acquired KMV's clients and its software tool for calculating the probability of credit default, here returning the EDF, or "Expected Default Frequency"; see KMV model. Moody's KMV integrated financial modeling software from each former company and, in 2003, debuted its credit risk management system, Credit Monitor.

In 2005, Moody's acquired Economy.com, an economics research and analytics firm based in West Chester, Pennsylvania, adding services related to economic and demographic research, country analysis, and data on industrial, financial, and regional markets.

The following year, in December 2006 the firm acquired Wall Street Analytics, a San Francisco-based financial analysis and monitoring software developer founded by Ron Unz, which then became Moody's Wall Street Analytics. The acquisition brought with it software for financial risk management, including CDOnet, a tool for collateralized debt obligation (CDO) valuation.

In August 2007, Moody's Corporation created a new division for its combined non-ratings businesses, Moody's Analytics, to operate separately from Moody's Investors Service. Subsidiary companies that make up Moody's Analytics today include Moody's KMV, Economy.com, Wall Street Analytics, Fermat International, Enb Consulting Ltd., and, most recently, CSI Global Education Inc. The division began operations with Moody's KMV, Economy.com and Wall Street Analytics, and other subsidiary companies were added to Moody's Analytics through later acquisitions.

In 2008, Moody's Analytics acquired Fermat International, a Brussels-based provider of software for financial risk and performance management in the banking sector, used by over 100 banks across 30 countries in Europe, the Middle East and Asia.

In December 2008, Moody's Analytics added Enb Consulting Ltd., a provider of professional training and career services in the financial sector based in Surrey, England, to Moody's Analytics Training Services. Its services include technical and soft skills training programs for banking and capital markets professionals.

Moody's Analytics further added to its training services in November 2010, when it acquired Canadian Securities Institute Global Education Inc. (CSI), a provider of training and certification for the financial sector, best known for its introductory course to stocks and bonds, the Canadian Securities Course, which is mandatory for Canadian licensed investment advisers.

In June 2010, Moody's Analytics formed a strategic alliance with Experian to provide software for financial institutions to manage consumer loan portfolios. The first product provided by the companies was Moody's CreditCycle Plus, a tool to forecast potential losses and provide stress testing of loan portfolios.

In March 2011, Moody's Analytics announced the release of a software program developed by Moody's Research Labs, the Mortgage Portfolio Analyzer, to assist portfolio managers in managing credit risk.

In November 2011, Moody's Corporation acquired a major stake in Copal Partners, providers of outsourced research and analytical services to institutional customers. This acquisition extends the research, data, software and training services offered by Moody's Analytics.

In December 2011, Moody's Corporation added Barrie & Hibbert Limited, a provider of risk management modeling tools for insurance companies, to Moody's Analytics enterprise risk management services in a deal worth £50,000,000.

In December 2013, Moody's acquired Amba Investment Services, a provider of investment research and quantitative analytics for global financial institutions.

In October 2014, Moody's acquired Lewtan, a provider to members of the global asset-securitization industry.

In December 2016, Copal Amba, formerly a Moody's Analytics subsidiary, was merged with Moody's Analytics to form Moody's Analytics' Knowledge Services unit.

Mark Almeida has been president of Moody's Analytics since January 2008 until October 2019. In October 2017, SBI collaborated with Moody's Analytics to train staff.

Moody's Analytics acquired Bureau van Dijk in 2017.

In November 2017, the Department of Justice charged three Chinese employees of Guangzhou Bo Yu Information Technology Company Limited with hacking into corporate entities in the United States, including Moody's Analytics.

Moody's Analytics acquired Cortera in 2021.

Moody's Analytics acquired kompany in 2021.

On March 6, 2024, Moody's Analytics was renamed to just "Moody's".

Moody's acquired Praedicat, a provider of casualty insurance analytics, in 2024.

== Products and services ==
Moody's products include Market Implied Ratings (MIR) and Expected Default Frequency (EDF) software packages. MIR applies Moody's ratings scale to credit and equity market price signals so users can identify investment opportunities; EDF estimates a company's credit default probability based on quantitative factors including market capitalization, equity, volatility and capital structure. The division also provides financial institutions with analytical and risk management software, including its RiskAnalyst credit risk management software, which is used to provide analysis of credit data for commercial loans and to calculate risk.
