= Mark Rubinstein =

American economist (1944–2019)

Mark Edward Rubinstein (June 8, 1944 – May 9, 2019) was a leading financial economist and financial engineer. He was Paul Stephens Professor of Applied Investment Analysis at the Haas School of Business of the University of California, Berkeley.

== Biography ==
Rubinstein had been on the Haas faculty since 1972 (retiring in 2012). He was instrumental in building the Haas-Berkeley Master of Financial Engineering (MFE) Program, focused on equipping candidates with skills in financial engineering for careers as quants; he was also involved in teaching courses on the program; and previously various other finance courses, both on the Haas-MBA and at Berkeley. The Berkeley-MFE was considered by many as the number one financial engineering program in the US.

He was the author of four books and numerous papers. His book Option Markets, was "the first work that popularized probabilistic and scientific methods in options, helping inaugurate the derivatives revolution." He held various professional offices, directing the American Finance Association, amongst others, and was editor of several first-tier academic journals including both the Journal of Financial Economics and the Journal of Finance. He was named as the IAQF Financial Engineer of the Year in 1995.

With fellow Berkeley finance professor Hayne E. Leland and adjunct professor John O'Brien, he co-founded Leland O'Brien Rubinstein Associates (LOR) in 1980 to provide portfolio protection strategies. In 1987, Leland, Rubinstein and O'Brien, were co-named "Businessmen of the Year" by Fortune magazine.

He held a A.B. in economics from Harvard University magna cum laude, an MBA in finance from Stanford University, and a PhD in finance from the University of California, Los Angeles.

== Research ==
Rubinstein was a senior and pioneering academic in the field of finance, focusing on derivatives, particularly options, and was known for his contributions to both theory and practice, especially the binomial options pricing model (also known as the Cox-Ross-Rubinstein model), as well as his work on discrete time stochastic calculus more generally. Here he provided early work in unifying general equilibrium theory and derivative pricing, linking risk-neutral probabilities and physical payoffs via their pricing kernel.

As outlined, along with Leland and O'Brien, Rubinstein developed the portfolio insurance financial product in 1976. (This strategy later became associated with the October 19, 1987, Stock Market Crash). With them, he also introduced the first exchange-traded fund (ETF) in the United States.

He popularized the term "exotic option", the phrase based either on "exotic wagers" in Horse racing, or due to the already established "Asian option" suggesting the "exotic Orient". He also worked on Compound options and Rainbow options, extending the theory to the calculation.

Rubinstein developed an early implied binomial tree — especially of relevance under a volatility smile — inferring risk-neutral probabilities (or state-contingent prices) from the simultaneously observed prices of European options. He also derived the Edgeworth binomial tree which, more generally, accommodates the share price distribution's (non-normal) skew and kurtosis.
