= William Goetzmann =

William Goetzmann could refer to:

- William H. Goetzmann, American historian, father of William N. Goetzmann
- William N. Goetzmann, Yale University professor of Finance and Management Studies, son of William H. Goetzmann
