= John Carrington Cox =

American economist (born 1943)

- Born: 1943 (age 82–83); Houston, Texas, U.S.

Academic background
- Education: Louisiana State University (BA); University of Pennsylvania (PhD)

Academic work
- Discipline: Financial economics
- School or tradition: Neoclassical economics
- Notable ideas: Binomial options pricing model Cox–Ingersoll–Ross model Risk-neutral pricing

John Carrington Cox (born 1943) is an American financial economist. He is the Nomura Professor of Finance Emeritus at the MIT Sloan School of Management. He developed the binomial options pricing model with Stephen Ross and Mark Rubinstein. He co-developed the Cox–Ingersoll–Ross model for interest rate dynamics with Jonathan Ingersoll and Ross.

== Early life and education ==
Cox received a Bachelor of Arts in economics from Louisiana State University. He completed his Doctor of Philosophy in finance and applied economics at the University of Pennsylvania.

== Academic career ==
Cox joined the faculty of the Stanford Graduate School of Business in 1975. At Stanford, he collaborated with Stephen Ross to value corporate securities and financial derivatives.

Cox transferred to the MIT Sloan School of Management. He was appointed the Nomura Professor of Finance. He retired from MIT and assumed emeritus status.

== Research ==
Cox's research centers on continuous-time finance and dynamic portfolio choice.

=== Option valuation ===
Cox and Stephen Ross published "The Valuation of Options for Alternative Stochastic Processes" in 1976. The paper introduced the principle of risk-neutral pricing. This framework proves derivative prices can be computed by adjusting probabilities so expected returns on assets equal the risk-free interest rate. Subsequent derivatives-pricing research built on this risk-neutral approach.

In 1979, Cox, Ross, and Mark Rubinstein published "Option Pricing: A Simplified Approach". The paper detailed the discrete-time binomial option pricing model. The model calculates option values through a step-by-step binomial tree. This mathematical structure allows for the pricing of American options, which can be exercised before expiration.

Cox worked with Fischer Black to apply option valuation to corporate securities. They published the Black-Cox model in 1976 to value corporate bonds featuring safety covenants and subordination arrangements.

=== Forward and futures pricing ===
Cox, Jonathan Ingersoll, and Stephen Ross also studied the relationship between forward and futures prices. In a 1981 paper, they showed that the two contracts, despite their similar economic functions, need not have identical equilibrium prices and developed a series of propositions characterizing their relationship. The analysis produced testable implications for differences between forward and futures prices and related both prices to the values of underlying assets.

=== Term structure of interest rates ===
Cox, Jonathan Ingersoll, and Stephen Ross published a general equilibrium model of asset prices in 1985. A companion paper applied the framework to model the term structure of interest rates. The resulting Cox-Ingersoll-Ross (CIR) model calculates interest rate dynamics using a mean-reverting state variable.

=== Portfolio policies ===
Cox and Chi-fu Huang published a method to calculate optimal consumption and portfolio policies in 1989. This work addresses how an investor's optimal asset allocation should evolve over time to meet long-term financial goals. His work examines how the length of the planning horizon affects optimal behavior.

== Awards and recognition ==
The International Association for Quantitative Finance named him Financial Engineer of the Year in 1998. He is a Fellow of the American Finance Association and of the Econometric Society.

== Selected publications ==
- Cox, John C.; Ross, Stephen A. (1976). "The Valuation of Options for Alternative Stochastic Processes". Journal of Financial Economics. 3 (1–2): 145–166. doi:10.1016/0304-405X(76)90023-4.
- Black, Fischer; Cox, John C. (1976). "Valuing Corporate Securities: Some Effects of Bond Indenture Provisions". Journal of Finance. 31 (2): 351–367. doi:10.1111/j.1540-6261.1976.tb01891.x.
- Cox, John C.; Ross, Stephen A.; Rubinstein, Mark (1979). "Option Pricing: A Simplified Approach". Journal of Financial Economics. 7 (3): 229–263. doi:10.1016/0304-405X(79)90015-1.
- Cox, John C.; Ingersoll, Jonathan E.; Ross, Stephen A. (1981). "The Relation Between Forward Prices and Futures Prices". Journal of Financial Economics. 9 (4): 321–346. doi:10.1016/0304-405X(81)90002-7.
- Cox, John C.; Ingersoll, Jonathan E.; Ross, Stephen A. (1985). "An Intertemporal General Equilibrium Model of Asset Prices". Econometrica. 53 (2): 363–384. doi:10.2307/1911241.
- Cox, John C.; Ingersoll, Jonathan E.; Ross, Stephen A. (1985). "A Theory of the Term Structure of Interest Rates". Econometrica. 53 (2): 385–407. doi:10.2307/1911242.
- Cox, John C.; Rubinstein, Mark (1985). Options Markets. Englewood Cliffs, NJ: Prentice Hall. ISBN 978-0136382058.
- Cox, John C.; Huang, Chi-fu (1989). "Optimal Consumption and Portfolio Policies when Asset Prices Follow a Diffusion Process". Journal of Economic Theory. 49 (1): 33–83. doi:10.1016/0022-0531(89)90067-7.
