= Basic affine jump diffusion =

Stochastic process

In mathematics probability theory, a basic affine jump diffusion (basic AJD) is a stochastic process Z of the form

$$dZ_t=\kappa (\theta -Z_t)\,dt+\sigma \sqrt{Z_t}\,dB_t+dJ_t,\qquad t\geq 0,
Z_{0}\geq 0,$$

where $B$ is a standard Brownian motion, and $J$ is an independent compound Poisson process with constant jump intensity $l$ and independent exponentially distributed jumps with mean $\mu$. For the process to be well defined, it is necessary that $\kappa \theta \geq 0$ and $\mu \geq 0$. A basic AJD is a special case of an affine process and of a jump diffusion. On the other hand, the Cox–Ingersoll–Ross (CIR) process is a special case of a basic AJD.

Basic AJDs are attractive for modeling default times in credit risk applications, since both the moment generating function

$$m\left( q\right) =\operatorname{E} \left( e^{q\int_0^t Z_s \, ds}\right)
,\qquad q\in \mathbb{R},$$

and the characteristic function

$$\varphi \left( u\right) =\operatorname{E} \left( e^{iu\int_0^t Z_s \, ds}\right) ,\qquad u\in \mathbb{R},$$

are known in closed form.

The characteristic function allows one to calculate the density of an integrated basic AJD

$$\int_0^t Z_s \, ds$$

by Fourier inversion, which can be done efficiently using the FFT.
