= International Association for Quantitative Finance =

- Abbreviation: IAQF
- Formation: 1992; 34 years ago
- Type: Non-profit organization
- Website: iaqf.org

The International Association for Quantitative Finance (IAQF), formerly the International Association of Financial Engineers (IAFE), is a non-profit professional society concerned with the fields of quantitative finance and financial engineering. The IAQF hosts several panel discussions throughout the year to discuss the issues that affect the industry from both academic and professional angles. Since it was established in 1992, the IAQF has expanded its reach to host events in San Francisco, Toronto, Boston, and London.

== Fischer Black Memorial Foundation ==
The educational arm of the IAQF is the Fischer Black Memorial Foundation (FBMF). While the IAQF focuses on the profession of financial engineering, the FBMF aims to expose students to the financial engineering field and help them work towards a career in the industry. Financial engineering is often underrepresented on university campuses, and the FBMF tries to bridge the gap between academia and the professional world. The main tool of the FBMF is the successful "How I Became a Quant" event series that bring professionals to college campuses to tell students about their experiences getting into the field. The FBMF also co-hosts (along with SIAM and New York University) an annual career fair that draws students from all over the country to meet with the premier hiring companies in the industry. This is one of the only career fairs that is specifically for financial engineering and it is popular with both the students and companies.

== Events ==
Often, these events are evening panels with 3–4 speakers; both practitioners and academics typically sit on these panels. Much of the information presented at these events is available afterward on the IAQF website.

Every year, the IAQF honors one member of the financial engineering world with its Financial Engineer of the Year (FEOY) award. The winner is selected through an exhaustive nomination and voting process and the list of former winners illustrates the high standards that the nominees must meet. Former FEOY recipients continue to serve the IAQF as Senior Fellows and include such notable names as Myron Scholes, Robert Merton, William Sharpe, and Jonathan Ingersoll.

The winner of the FEOY is celebrated at an annual Gala-dinner hosted by the IAQF and traditionally held at the United Nations building in New York City.

The IAQF hosts an annual conference in the late spring, which is an all day event. The schedule consists of 2–3 panels and a keynote speech by the previous year's Financial Engineer of the Year, all of which circle around one common theme.

== Financial Engineer of the Year (FEOY) ==
Commencing in 1993, this award has been presented annually to an individual who has made a significant contribution in the development and creative application of financial engineering. An award dinner is held annually to honor the achievements of Financial Engineer of the Year. All listed recipients are IAQF Senior Fellows.

- 2025 Bruno Dupire
- 2024 Robert Whaley
- 2023 Leif B. Andersen
- 2022 Hélyette Geman
- 2021 Dilip B. Madan
- 2020 Paul Glasserman
- 2019 Cliff Asness
- 2018 Francis Longstaff
- 2017 Michael Brennan
- 2016 Hayne Leland
- 2015 Eduardo Schwartz
- 2014 Martin L. Leibowitz
- 2013 Douglas T. Breeden
- 2012 Robert Litzenberger
- 2011 Robert F. Engle
- 2010 Peter P. Carr
- 2009 Richard Roll
- 2008 Robert Litterman
- 2007 Jack L. Treynor
- 2006 James H. Simons
- 2005 Phelim Boyle
- 2004 Oldrich A. Vasicek
- 2003 J. Darrell Duffie
- 2002 Jonathan E. Ingersoll Jr.
- 2001 Andrew Lo
- 2001 Myron S. Scholes (Lifetime Achievement)
- 2000 Emanuel Derman
- 1999 John C. Hull
- 1998 John C. Cox
- 1997 Robert A. Jarrow
- 1996 Stephen A. Ross
- 1995 Mark Rubinstein
- 1994 Fischer Black
- 1993 Robert C. Merton

== Board of directors ==
The IAQF is currently presided over by a 15-member Board of Directors. The members of the Board come from many different backgrounds and include many influential names in the industry.

== Committees ==
The IAQF comprises six committees: the Credit Risk, Education, Investor Risk, Liquidity Risk, Operational Risk, and Technology Committees each focus on a narrow view of financial engineering.
