= Rebalance =

Rebalance may refer to:

- Rebalancing investments
- Self-balancing binary search tree
