= Financial Analysts Journal =

Quarterly academic journal

- Discipline: Finance
- Language: English
- Edited by: William N. Goetzmann

Publication details
- Former name: The Analysts Journal
- History: 1945–present
- Publisher: Routledge on behalf of the CFA Institute
- Frequency: Quarterly
- Open access: Hybrid
- Impact factor: 3.273 (2021)

Standard abbreviations
- ISO 4: Financ. Anal. J.

Indexing
- ISSN: 0015-198X (print); 1938-3312 (web)
- LCCN: 2008215499
- JSTOR: 0015198X
- OCLC no.: 754651003

Links
- Journal homepage; Online access; Online archive

The Financial Analysts Journal is a quarterly peer-reviewed academic journal covering investment management, published by Routledge on behalf of the CFA Institute. It was established in 1945 and as of August 2022, the editor-in-chief is William N. Goetzmann.

== History ==
In 1945, the New York Society of Security Analysts established The Analysts Journal, which in 1960 was renamed the Financial Analysts Journal when the society was merged into the CFA Institute. From 1960 to 2016, the journal appeared bimonthly; from 2017 onwards it has been published quarterly. Since 1960, the journal has been published by Routledge.

Starting in 1960, the journal has awarded the annual "Graham and Dodd Awards of Excellence" to "recognize excellence in research and financial writing in the Financial Analysts Journal".

As of August 2022, the editor-in-chief is William N. Goetzmann.

== Reception ==
In a 2011 study of academic business and financial journals, the School of Management of Cranfield University gave the Financial Analysts Journal its highest ranking of 4 ("world-leading"). The July 2022 publication (the 68th edition) of the "Journal Quality List", a compilation of ten global ranking surveys of academic journals in the fields of Economics, Finance, Accounting, Management, and Marketing, showed that the Financial Analysts Journal was ranked at the highest or second-highest grade by almost all surveys. According to the Journal Citation Reports, the journal has a 2021 impact factor of 3.273.

=== Abstracting and indexing ===
The journal is abstracted and indexed in:

- Current Contents/Social and Behavioral Sciences
- EBSCO databases
- EconLit
- International Bibliography of the Social Sciences
- ProQuest databases
- Scopus
- Social Sciences Citation Index

== See also ==
- Financial analyst
- The Journal of Portfolio Management
