= Jonathan E. Ingersoll =

American economist

- Born: March 28, 1949 (age 77)

Academic background
- Doctoral advisor: Robert C. Merton

Academic work
- Discipline: Financial Economics
- School or tradition: Neoclassical economics
- Notable ideas: Cox–Ingersoll–Ross model

Jonathan Edwards "Jon" Ingersoll Jr. is an American economist. He is the Adrian C. Israel Professor Emeritus of International Trade and Finance at the Yale School of Management. Prior to coming to Yale he was on the faculty at the Graduate School of Business at the University of Chicago.

Ingersoll's research in finance focuses on multiperiod asset valuation, including the pricing of options and futures and the term structure of interest rates. With John C. Cox and Stephen A. Ross, he developed a continuous-time intertemporal general-equilibrium model of asset prices in which asset prices and their stochastic properties are determined endogenously. Their 1985 Econometrica paper derived a partial differential equation that asset prices must satisfy, allowing the equilibrium value of an asset to be expressed in terms of the underlying real state variables of the economy. In a companion paper published immediately afterward in the same issue, Cox, Ingersoll and Ross developed the Cox–Ingersoll–Ross model of the term structure of interest rates, in which the short rate on the yield curve follows a square-root diffusion process.

Ingersoll is a founding member of the Society for Financial Studies and has held editorial positions at several journals, including the Review of Financial Studies and the Journal of Finance. He was named Financial Engineer of the Year by the International Association of Financial Engineers in 2002.

He earned his SM (1973) and PhD (1976) from MIT Sloan and his SB in physics (1971) from MIT.

== Bibliography ==
- Jonathan E. Ingersoll (1987). Theory of Financial Decision Making. Rowman & Littlefield. ISBN 978-0-8476-7359-9.
