= William N. Goetzmann =

American economist and academic

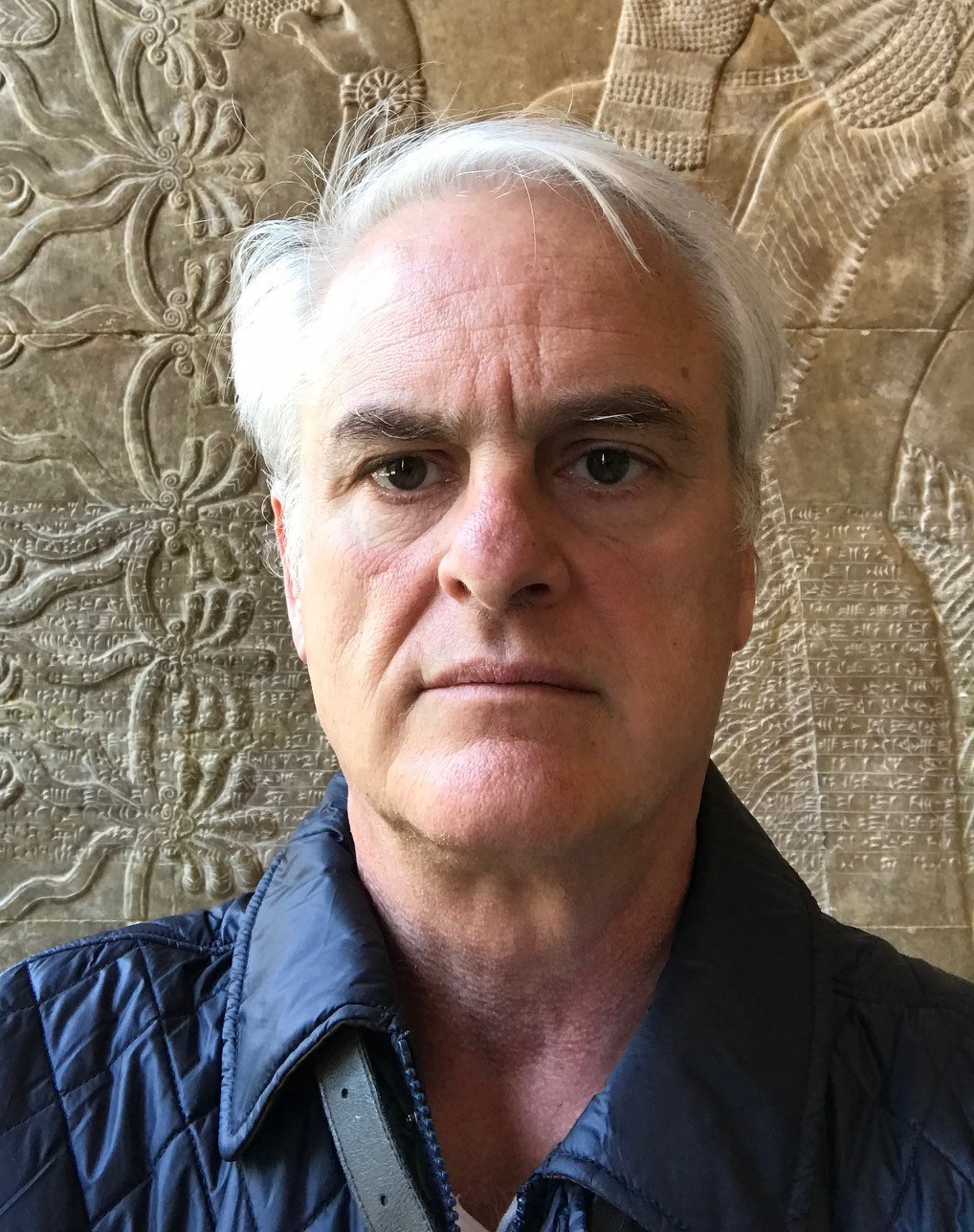
- Born: February 4, 1956 (age 70)
- Education: Yale College(BA); Yale School of Management (MBA); Yale University (PhD)
- Children: 1
- Awards: James R. Vertin Award by the Chartered Financial Analysts Institute Research Foundation (2018) Numerous research paper awards
- Scientific career
- Fields: Financial Economics, Financial History, Economics of the Arts
- Workplaces: Columbia Graduate School of Business, Yale School of Management
- Doctoral advisors: Jonathan E. Ingersoll, Stephen A. Ross
- Website: William N. Goetzmann

William N. Goetzmann (born February 4, 1956) is the Edwin J. Beinecke Professor of Finance and Management Studies at the Yale School of Management, and a research associate of the National Bureau of Economic Research. In 2018, he received the James R. Vertin Award by the Chartered Financial Analysts Institute Research Foundation "for a body of research notable for its relevance and enduring value to investment professionals".

== Early life and education ==
Goetzmann is the son of Pulitzer and Parkman Prize-winning historian, William H. Goetzmann, and Mewes Mueller Goetzmann.

He graduated from Yale College in 1978 with a degree in Art History and Archaeology, earned his MBA in 1986 from the Yale School of Management, and his Ph.D. from Yale University in Operations Research with a dissertation on topics in finance in 1990.

Prior to his academic career, Goetzmann worked as an archaeologist, a writer and producer of PBS documentaries, and served as the director of the American Museum of Western Art in Denver, Colorado during 1984–85.

== Academic career ==
=== Roles ===
Goetzmann was made an assistant professor of finance at Columbia University Graduate School of Business beginning in 1990 and returned to Yale as an associate professor at the Yale School of Management in 1994, where he is currently a chaired professor. Since January 2021, he has served as the Executive Editor of the Financial Analysts Journal. He is the faculty director of the International Center for Finance at the Yale School of Management, and faculty director of the school's Executive MBA program in Asset Management.

=== Research ===
His research focuses on asset management, investor behavior, and the history of global capital markets. He has written widely cited papers about investment fund performance, real estate, the long-term history of stock markets the economics of the art market. Following the 2008 financial crisis, Goetzmann co-authored a 2009 research report with Andrew Ang and Stephen Schaefer for the Norwegian Ministry of Finance evaluating the sovereign wealth fund's use of active management. This research provided ground-breaking recommendations on the use of factor investing for institutional portfolios.

=== Works ===
He has authored and co-edited a number of books, including Money Changes Everything: How Finance Made Civilization Possible, a history of finance from antiquity to the modern era, and The Great Mirror of Folly: Finance, Culture, and the Great Crash of 1720, about the world's first global stock market bubble. In 2020, he was featured in the newsletter, Yale Insights, with an article and a video that focus on the global financial bubbles that have occurred since the one that crashed in 1720.
