= Constant proportion portfolio insurance =

Market trading strategy

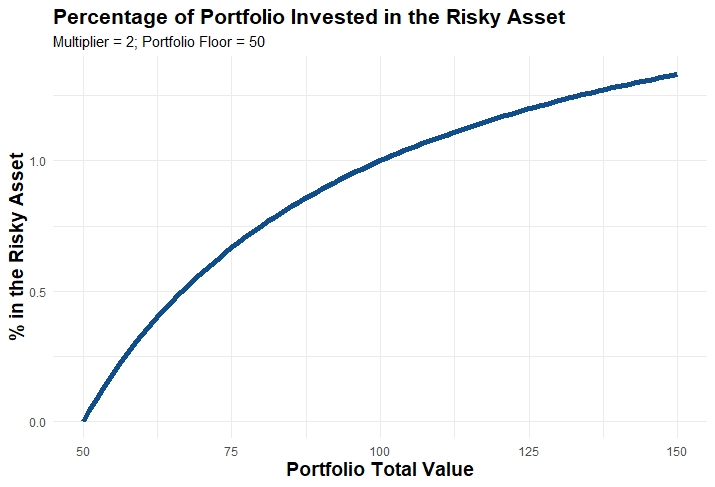
CPPI portfolios move more portfolio value to the risky asset as the distance between the portfolio value and the floor increases. As the total value of the portfolio decreases, less of the portfolio is allocated to the risky asset. Leverage may be employed by the investor depending on the multiplier value and the total portfolio value.

Constant proportion portfolio investment (CPPI) is a trading strategy that allows an investor to maintain an exposure to the upside potential of a risky asset while providing a capital guarantee against downside risk. The outcome of the CPPI strategy is somewhat similar to that of buying a call option, but does not use option contracts. Thus CPPI is sometimes referred to as a convex strategy, as opposed to a "concave strategy" like constant mix.

CPPI products on a variety of risky assets have been sold by financial institutions, including equity indices and credit default swap indices. Constant proportion portfolio insurance (CPPI) was first studied by Perold (1986) for fixed-income instruments and by Black and Jones (1987), Black and Rouhani (1989), and Black and Perold for equity instruments.

In order to guarantee the capital invested, the seller of portfolio insurance maintains a position in a treasury bonds or liquid monetary instruments, together with a leveraged position in an "active asset", which constitutes the performance engine. Examples of risky assets are a basket of equity shares or a basket of mutual funds across various asset classes. While in the case of a bond+call, the client would only get the remaining proceeds (or initial cushion) invested in an option, bought once and for all, the CPPI provides leverage through a multiplier. This multiplier is set to 100 divided by the crash size (as a percentage) that is being insured against.

For example, say an investor has a $100 portfolio, a floor of $90 (price of the bond to guarantee his $100 at maturity) and a multiplier of 5 (ensuring protection against a drop of at most 20% before rebalancing the portfolio). Then on day one, the writer will allocate (5 * ($100 – $90)) = $50 to the risky asset and the remaining $50 to the riskless asset (the bond). The exposure will be revised as the portfolio value changes, i.e., when the risky asset performs and with leverage multiplies by 5 the performance (or vice versa). Same with the bond. These rules are predefined and agreed once and for all during the life of the product. The allocation to the risky asset may vary during the life of the product. In case the active asset performance is negative, the values of the active asset and the CPPI strategy will decrease, and as a result the allocation of the strategy to the active asset will decrease. Should the exposure to the risky asset drop to zero or a very low level, then the CPPI is said to be deleveraged or cashed out. The CPPI strategy will then be fully allocated to the low risk asset until the product matures.

CPPI strategies aim at offering capital protection to its investors. Compared to a bond + call strategy, the drawback of the CPPI is that it follows a buy high sell low strategy. Volatility will hurt the performance of the investment, and once the strategy has deleveraged, it never recovers and the investors have to wait until maturity to receive their initial investments. The benefit is that CPPI protection is much cheaper and less impacted by market movements.

A variation of CPPI is the so-called Time Invariant Portfolio Protection Strategy (TIPP) where the capital is (partially) protected continuously (typically on a daily basis) as opposed to a protection at a fixed date in the future.

== Terminology ==
Bond floor
The bond floor is the value below which the value of the CPPI portfolio should never fall in order to be able to ensure the payment of all future due cash flows (including notional guarantee at maturity).
Multiplier
Unlike a regular bond + call strategy which only allocates the remaining dollar amount on top of the bond value (say the bond to pay 100 is worth 80, the remaining cash value is 20), the CPPI leverages the cash amount. The multiplier is usually 4 or 5, meaning you do not invest 80 in the bond and 20 in the equity, rather m*(100-bond) in the equity and the remainder in the zero coupon bond.
Gap
A measure of the proportion of the equity part compared to the cushion, or (CPPI-bond floor)/equity. Theoretically, this should equal 1/multiplier and the investor uses periodic rebalancing of the portfolio to attempt to maintain this.

== Dynamic trading strategy ==
If the gap remains between an upper and a lower trigger band (resp. releverage and deleverage triggers), the strategy does not trade. It effectively reduces transaction costs, but the drawback is that whenever a trade event to reallocate the weights to the theoretical values happen, the prices have either shifted quite a bit high or low, resulting in the CPPI effectively buying (due to leverage) high and selling low.

== Risks ==
As dynamic trading strategies assume that capital markets trade in a continuous fashion, gap risk is the main concern of CPPI writer, since a sudden drop in the risky underlying trading instrument(s) could reduce the overall CPPI net asset value below the value of the bond floor needed to guarantee the capital at maturity. In the models initially introduced by Black and Jones Black & Rouhani, this risk does not materialize: to measure it one needs to take into account sudden moves (jumps) in prices. Such sudden price moves may make it impossible to shift the position from the risky assets to the bond, leading the structure to a state where it is impossible to guarantee principal at maturity. With this feature being ensured by contract with the buyer, the writer has to put up money of his own to cover for the difference (the issuer has effectively written a put option on the structure NAV). Banks generally charge a small "protection" or "gap" fee to cover this risk, usually as a function of the notional leveraged exposure.

== Dynamics of a CPPI Portfolio ==
Fundamentally, the CPPI strategy can be understood as $V_{risky} = m \cdot (V - F)$ where $V_{risky}$ is the value of assets in the risky portfolio, $V$ is the starting value of assets in the total portfolio, $F$ is the asset level below which the total portfolio should not fall, and $m \geq 1$ is the multiplier. Because the percentage of the portfolio invested in the risky asset at any given time can vary, the dynamics of a CPPI strategy are complex. The average return and variance of a CPPI strategy across investment period $[t,T]$ are

$\mu_{CPPI} = \frac{F/V}{e^{rt-rT}}V + C e^{Tr+Tm\mu - Tmr}$

$\sigma^2_{CPPI}=C^2 e^{2T(r+m\mu-mr)} \left(e^{Tm^2\sigma^2}-1 \right)$

where $\mu$ and $\sigma^2$ are the average return and variance of the risky asset, respectively, and $C = \left(1- \frac{F/V}{e^{rt-rT}} e^{-rT} \right) V$.

== Practical CPPI ==
In some CPPI structured products, the multipliers are constant. Say for a 3 asset CPPI, we have a ratio of x:y:100%-x-y as the third asset is the safe and riskless equivalent asset like cash or bonds. At the end of each period, the exposure is rebalanced. Say we have a note of $1 million, and the initial allocations are 100k, 200k, and 700k. After period one, the market value changes to 120k:80k:600k. We now rebalance to increase exposure on the outperforming asset and reduce exposure to the worst-performing asset. Asset A is the best performer, so its rebalanced to be left at 120k, B is the worst performer, to its rebalanced to 60k, and C is the remaining, 800k-120k-60k=620k. We are now back to the original fixed weights of 120:60:620 or ratio-wise 2:1:remaining.

== See also ==
- Portfolio insurance
