= Neoclassical finance =

Neoclassical finance is an approach within finance, developing since the mid-1960s, which holds that markets are efficient, and that prices will thus tend to equilibrium and be "rational"; and asset pricing models must then reflect these. It may be contrasted with, for example, behavioral finance which is based on differing, less idealized, assumptions regarding markets and investors. It built on earlier developments such as the Austrian School of economics, and cross-fertilized with atomic physics (see state price) and other heavily quantitative disciplines.

== See also ==
- Financial economics and particularly, #Arbitrage-free pricing and equilibrium
- Neoclassical economics
- Fundamental theorem of asset pricing
- Modern portfolio theory
- Post-modern portfolio theory
- Stephen Ross
