= Capital guarantee =

A capital guarantee product means that when an investor buys, or "enters", this specific structured product he is guaranteed to get back at maturity a part or the totality of the money he invested on day one. Examples of capital guarantees include bond plus option, usually bond plus call, and constant proportion portfolio insurance.
