= Leif B. Andersen =

Academic in finance

Leif B. Andersen is an academic and researcher in the field of quantitative finance. He has a master's degree in electrical engineering from the Technical University of Denmark, an MBA from the University of California, Berkeley, and a PhD in finance from the University of Aarhus business school. He serves as the Global Co-Head of the Quantitative Strategies & Data Group at Bank of America and an adjunct professor at NYU Courant Institute of Mathematical Sciences, where he served as the adviser of the Mathematics in Finance industry, and in Carnegie Mellon University's MS in Computational Finance program. Leif is an Associate Editor of The Journal of Computational Finance.

== Career ==
Leif started his career as an Engineer at Robert Bosch GMBH (Stuttgart, Germany) where he specialized in flexible manufacturing systems using robotics and vision systems. He then worked for 9 years at General Re Financial Products (GRFP), before moving to Bank of America where he has been employed since 2002.

Leif has published numerous research papers in the field of quantitative finance. He is also co-author of the three volume book series - Interest Rate Modelling and Co-editor of the book Margin in Derivatives Trading.

Leif is a recipient of several awards. He was named the Risk.Net Quant of the Year twice in 2001 and 2018. In 2023, he was awarded the prestigious Financial Engineer of the Year (FEOY) award by IAQF.
