= Hayne Leland =

Economist (University of California-Berkeley)

Hayne Leland is an economist and professor emeritus at the University of California, Berkeley. Before becoming emeritus, he was the Arno Rayner Professor of Finance at the Haas School of Business. Before joining Berkeley, Leland was an assistant professor in economics at Stanford University, and he has held visiting professorships at the University of California, Los Angeles and the University of Cambridge. He received his A.B. from Harvard College, followed by an M.Sc.(Econ) at the London School of Economics and a Ph.D. in economics from Harvard. He received an honorary doctorate from the University of Paris (Dauphine) in 2007.

His research in capital markets and corporate finance has received several awards, including the inaugural $100,000 Stephen A. Ross Prize in Financial Economics in 2008. In 2016, he was named "Financial Engineer of the Year" by the International Association of Quantitative Finance. Leland served as President of the American Finance Association in 1997, and has served on numerous scientific advisory boards, including those of Goldman Sachs, Wells Capital Management, the Chicago Mercantile Exchange, and the Swiss National Science Foundation. He was an independent trustee of the mutual funds group of Barclays Global Investors (BGI) before BGI's acquisition by BlackRock.

Much of Leland's theoretical work has found direct applications in asset management and corporate financial structure. This includes portfolio insurance, option pricing with transaction costs, and valuation of risky corporate debt. More recently, he has worked on introducing equity-sharing contracts for home purchase financing and on structuring retirement funds to provide assured income in retirement.

Portfolio Insurance and the 1987 Crash.

In 1979, Leland realized that then-recent work on option pricing could be applied to dynamically hedge a portfolio, resulting in a financial product termed "portfolio insurance". In conjunction with Mark Rubinstein, a Berkeley colleague and options expert, and John O'Brien, a financial industry professional, he co-founded Leland O'Brien Rubinstein Associates (LOR) in 1980 to provide portfolio protection strategies. LOR's protected asset base grew rapidly, reaching $50 billion by mid-1987 (the equivalent of almost $500 billion when adjusted to the S&P 500 level in mid-2017). In 1987, Leland and his partners, Rubinstein and O'Brien, were co-named "Businessmen of the Year" by Fortune magazine.

The portfolio insurance strategy required that clients sell (to hedge) stocks or stock index futures as the market declined. During the crash of October 19, 1987, the drop in stock prices required LOR to sell large amounts of stock index futures, creating further downward pressure on stock prices. While portfolio insurance was not the initial cause of the crash, the Brady Commission Report examining trading that day concluded that insurance selling —roughly 15% of total stock and futures sold that day —contributed to the crash's magnitude. Market mechanism failures, including the failure of the SuperDot system, were also held responsible in the Brady Report.

The SuperTrust: The first U.S. ETF.

Looking for a means to provide portfolio protection without dynamic trading, LOR then developed a fund structure to allow fully collateralized portfolio protection and basket trading. LOR's SuperTrust consisted of two funds, known as SuperUnits, whose assets were S&P 500 stocks and short-term Treasury securities, respectively. To provide a basket product, shares of the SuperUnits required continuous trading when markets were open, similar to the trading of exchange-listed closed-end fund shares. But for the funds' market value to closely track the underlying portfolio value—a problem with closed-end funds whose shares often fell to discounts—fund shares also needed to be redeemable daily for cash or for underlying assets at net asset value (NAV). The SuperTrust's SuperUnits allowed smaller redemptions in cash, with larger redemptions in stock bundles. The Investment Company Act of 1940 disallows such a fund structure, i.e., with simultaneous closed-end and open-end fund properties, but it does allow the SEC to provide exemptions to the regulations when they're deemed to be in the public interest.

LOR applied for exemptive relief from the U.S. Securities and Exchange Commission (SEC) in April 1989. Arguments justifying LOR's request for exemption are available at http://www.40act.com/community/etf-supertrust-history-files/. While these arguments are now widely accepted and relief has been granted to hundreds of ETFs, the request was controversial at the time and required five amended applications and a hearing before the full Commission before final approval in October 1990. After some initial funding delays, LOR launched the SuperTrust with $1 billion in assets in November 1992, with the SuperUnit shares trading on the American Stock Exchange (Amex). The SuperTrust's SuperUnits were the first U.S. exchange-traded funds that allowed daily redemption of shares at NAV. The SuperTrust's Index SuperUnit was the first S&P 500-based ETF.

The Amex initially had cooperated with LOR to develop a basket product, but subsequently decided to follow its own path with the Standard and Poor's Depository Receipt (SPDR), also based on the S&P 500. Their request for exemptive relief from the SEC was filed over a year after LOR's, and approval was received two years after LOR's. Their proposal was somewhat different in structure (e.g., redemption in large stock bundles only, and no sub-shares) but cited The SuperTrust exemptive order as precedent, using many of the same arguments made previously in application by LOR.

The SPDR was launched in 1993, three months after SuperUnit shares began trading, with an initial asset value just over $6 million. However, with Amex's marketing blitz (e.g., "spiders" descending from the ceiling onto the trading floor) and campaign, the SPDR ultimately became the basket product that gained liquidity and, for many years, was the largest ETF. The SuperTrust, which had an initial term of 3 years, failed to gain competitive liquidity and was not rolled over after its initial term.
