= Bond plus option =

In finance, a Bond+Option is a capital guarantee product that provides an investor with a fixed, predetermined participation to an option. Buying the zero-coupon bond ensures the guarantee of the capital, and the remaining proceeds are used to buy an option.

== Structure ==
As an example, we can consider a bond+call on 5 years, with Nokia as an underlying. Say it is a USD currency option, and that 5 year rates are 4.7%. That gives you a zero-coupon bond price of $ZCB(USD,5y,4.7\%)=e^{-5*0.047}\approx0.7906$.

Say we are counting in units of $100. We then have to buy $79.06 worth of bonds to guarantee the 100 to be repaid at maturity, and we have $20.94 to spend on an option. Now the option price is unlikely to be exactly equal to 20.94 in this case, and it really depends on the underlying. Say we are using the Black–Scholes price for the call, and that we strike the option at the money, the volatility is the defining part here. A call on an underlying with implied volatility of 25% will give you a Black–Scholes price of $15.7 while with a volatility of 45%, you'd have to pay $21.76.

Hence the participation would be the proportion you can get with the money you have.

- In the 25% vol case you get a 133% participation
- In the 45% vol case, 96%.

The alternative is to simply buy the bond, which would return $126.49.
