= John Vasicek =

American filmmaker (born 1974)

John Vašíček
- Born: January 30, 1974 (age 52)

John Vasicek (born January 30, 1974) is an American filmmaker. His debut film, Voyeur, was selected for the 2007 Sonoma film festival. Two years later he produced My Movie Girl, which was screened at more than 25 film festivals. His latest script, Rhodes to Love, which won both an Odysseus Award (Best Script) and the Greek Film Lovers Award (Audience Favorite) at the 2013 London Greek Film Festival, will be directed by the acclaimed Australian filmmaker Nadia Tass. His script "Adam & Eve" was a Grand Prize Winner at the Stage 32 Annual Feature Contest.

Vasicek received his master's degree in Motion Picture and Television from the Academy of Art University, 2005, in San Francisco, California. His undergraduate work was in business. Vasicek became a Certified Public Accountant while working for the international accounting firm KPMG before entering filmmaking.

He is the son of mathematician Oldřich Vašíček, and is an avid skier.
