= Wilkie investment model =

The Wilkie investment model, often just called Wilkie model, is a stochastic asset model developed by A. D. Wilkie that describes the behavior of various economics factors as stochastic time series. These time series are generated by autoregressive models. The main factor of the model which influences all asset prices is the consumer price index. The model is mainly in use for actuarial work and asset liability management. Because of the stochastic properties of that model it is mainly combined with Monte Carlo methods.

Wilkie first proposed the model in 1986, in a paper published in the Transactions of the Faculty of Actuaries. It has since been the subject of extensive study and debate. Wilkie himself updated and expanded the model in a second paper published in 1995. He advises to use that model to determine the "funnel of doubt", which can be seen as an interval of minimum and maximum development of a corresponding economic factor.

== Components ==
- price inflation
- wage inflation
- share yield
- share dividend
- consols yield (long-term interest rate)
- bank rate (short-term interest rate)
