= Oldřich Vašíček =

Czech mathematician and quantitative analyst

Oldřich Alfons Vašíček
- Born: 1942 (age 83–84); Czechoslovakia
- Occupations: Mathematician, quantitative analyst
- Known for: Vasicek model, KMV model
- Scientific career
- Fields: Mathematics, Quantitative finance
- Institutions: KMV Corporation

Oldřich Alfons Vašíček (Czech pronunciation: [ˈoldr̝ɪx ˈalfons ˈvaʃiːt͜ʃɛk]; born 1942) is a Czech mathematician and quantitative analyst, best known for his pioneering work on interest rate and credit modelling; with the eponymous Vasicek model and KMV model.

== Biography ==
Vašíček received his master's degree in math from the Czech Technical University, 1964, and a doctorate in probability theory from Charles University four years later. After the Soviet invasion of Czechoslovakia in 1968, he defected to America, settled in San Francisco, and found employment in the management science department of Wells Fargo Bank in January 1969. His academic career also included teaching graduate finance at the University of Rochester, the University of California, Berkeley, and ESSEC Business School in France.

In 1970, Wells Fargo sponsored a conference that included Fischer Black and Myron Scholes, who had just begun thinking seriously about the problem of valuing stock options. Of course, their paper on that subject, timed so as to coincide with a related paper by Robert C. Merton, would revolutionize financial economics three years later. Even their preliminary thoughts at the 1970 conference excited Vašíček, who soon made related issues his own life's work.

Vašíček's own breakthrough paper, "An equilibrium characterization of the term structure" describing the dynamics of the yield curve, appeared in the Journal of Financial Economics in 1977. The mean-reverting short-rate model he describes is commonly known as the Vasicek model.

In recognition of the above paper, and subsequent work, the International Association of Financial Engineers named Vašíček its IAFE/Sungard Financial Engineer of the Year, in 2004. Vašíček has also received the Risk magazine Lifetime Achievement Award. He has been inducted into the Derivatives Strategy Hall of Fame, the Fixed Income Analysts Society Hall of Fame and the Risk Magazine Hall of Fame. His 1987 paper Probability of Loss on Loan Portfolio was included in the book Derivatives Pricing: The Classic Collection, a selection of the "19 most influential papers" on quantitative finance.

In 1989 Stephen Kealhofer, John McQuown and Oldřich Vašíček founded the company KMV. In 2002 the three entrepreneurs sold the company to Moody's for $210 million. In 2007, Moody's KMV was renamed to Moody's Analytics.

Vašíček plays the flute and is an avid windsurfer. He has three sons, one of whom is the screenwriter John Vasicek.

== See also ==
- Short rate model
- Vasicek model
- KMV model
