= Dilip Madan =

Indian-American financial economist (born 1946)

Dilip B. Madan
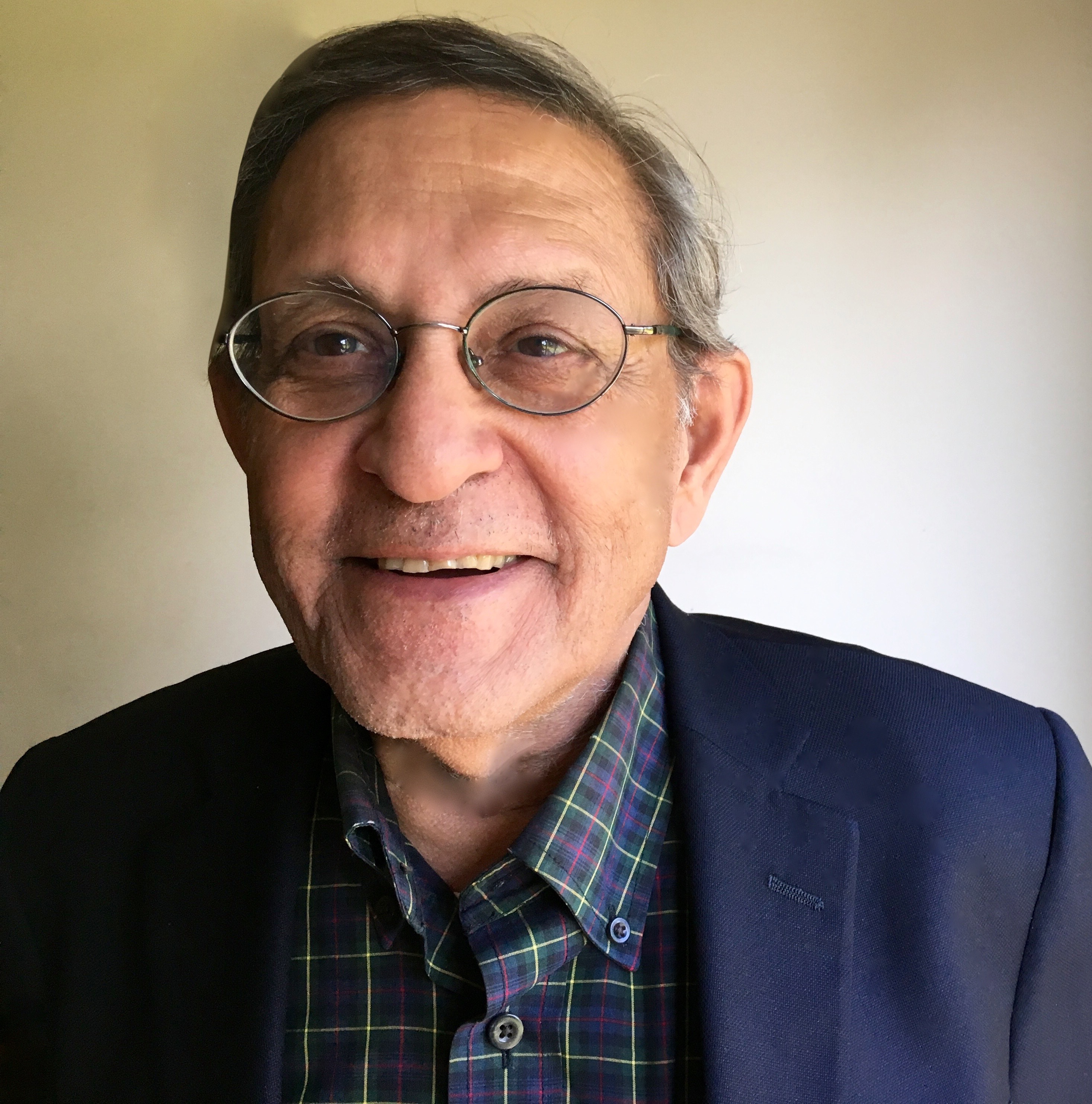
- Born: December 12, 1946 (age 79); India
- Occupations: Financial economist, mathematician, academic, and author
- Awards: Humboldt Research Award, Alexander von Humboldt Foundation (2006)

Academic background
- Education: (BCom) University of Bombay (PhD) University of Maryland

Academic work
- Institutions: University of Maryland

Dilip B. Madan is an Indian-American financial economist, mathematician, academic, and author. He is professor emeritus of finance at the University of Maryland.

Madan is most known for his work on the variance gamma model, the fast Fourier transform method for option pricing, and the development of Conic Finance. Madan is a recipient of the 2006 Humboldt Research Award. He has authored several books, including Applied Conic Finance and Nonlinear Valuation and Non-Gaussian Risks in Finance.

== Education ==
Madan completed his Bachelor of Commerce in Accounting from the University of Bombay in 1967. In 1972, he obtained a Ph.D. in Economics from the University of Maryland, followed by another PhD in mathematics in 1975 from the same university.

== Career ==
Madan began his academic career in 1972 as an assistant professor of economics at the University of Maryland. In 1976, he joined the University of Sydney and held various positions, including lecturer in economic statistics from 1976 to 1979 and senior lecturer in econometrics from 1980 to 1988. Subsequently, he rejoined the University of Maryland, where he was appointed as assistant professor of finance between 1989 and 1992, served as an associate professor of finance between 1992 and 1997, and held an appointment as a professor of finance between 1997 and 2019. Currently, he is professor emeritus of finance at the University of Maryland since 2019.

Madan has been a director and treasurer of the Scientific Association of Mathematical Finance since 2021.

== Research ==
Madan's quantitative finance research has won him the 2021 Northfield Financial Engineer of the Year Award from the International Association for Quantitative Finance. He has authored numerous publications spanning the areas of financial markets, general equilibrium theory, and mathematical finance including books and articles in peer-reviewed journals.

=== Valuation model ===
Madan's valuation model research has contributed to the improvement and development of valuation models in various fields including business and finance. In his analysis of the impact of model risk on the valuation of barrier options, he highlighted the divergent pricing outcomes of up-and-out call options resulting from the use of different stochastic processes to calibrate the underlying vanilla options surface. He conducted pricing comparisons between Sato processes and conventional models, revealing that Sato processes exhibit relatively higher pricing for cliquets, while effectively preserving the value of long-dated out-of-the-money realized variance options. Focusing his research efforts on credit value adjustments, his study proposed a theory of capital requirements to address the problem of cross-default exposures. Furthermore, he presented a Markov chain-based method for valuing structured financial products, offering financial institutions a tool to assess locally capped and floored cliquets, as well as unhedged and hedged variance swap contracts. He also introduced a conic finance-based nonlinear equity valuation model, which integrated risk charges contingent upon measure distortions. More recently in 2016 and 2022, he co-authored with Wim Schoutens two books titled Applied Conic Finance and Nonlinear valuation and non-Gaussian risks in finance, which provided an overview of the newly established conic finance theory, including its theoretical framework and various applications.

=== Options pricing ===
Madan's options pricing research has focused on conducting empirical studies to test the performance of various option pricing models using real-world data. While exploring the valuation of European call options employing the Vasicek-Gaussian stochastic process, his research proposed an approach to approximate and determine the equilibrium change of measure in incomplete markets, using log return mean, variance, and kurtosis. In a collaborative study with Robert A. Jarrow, he demonstrated the application of term-structure-associated financial instruments in formulating dynamic portfolio management tactics, specifically aimed at mitigating distinct systematic jump hazards inherent in asset returns. In his early works, he introduced the variance gamma process, a stochastic model for log stock price dynamics, highlighting its symmetric statistical density with some kurtosis and negatively skewed risk-neutral density with higher kurtosis. His study further proposed using Markov Chains and homogeneous Levy processes, specifically the variance gamma process, as a robust modeling approach for financial asset prices, thereby facilitating the computation of option and series prices. His research work on pricing European options involved exploring self-similar risk-neutral processes and proposing two parameter stability-based models, highlighting their usefulness in studying the time variation of option prices. Concentrating his research on risk premia in options markets, he used the variance gamma model for density synthesis, revealing mean reversion and predictability in premia, with particular emphasis on short-term market crashes and long-term market rallies. His recent work in 2021 has contributed to the understanding of risk-neutral densities and jump arrival tails by introducing theoretical examples and practical models based on quasi-infinitely divisible distributions.

=== Asset pricing ===
Madan's contributions to asset pricing research have resulted in the development of asset pricing models. His early research examined the minimum variance estimator to achieve a singular optimal power and provided approximations for estimating the scalar diffusion coefficient through the application of Ito calculus and Milstein methods. He also addressed the paradox posed by Artzner and Heath, offering a solution determining that completeness pertains to the topology of the cash flow space and is associated with the singular nature of the price functional in the topological dual space. In 2001, he proposed a modeling approach for asset price processes and illustrated that asset price dynamics are more suitably represented by pure jump processes, devoid of any continuous martingale component. In his analysis of equilibrium asset pricing, his work established that factor prices are influenced by exponentially tilted prices due to non-Gaussian factor risk exposures, which can be determined from the univariate probability distribution of the factor exposure. Moreover, with Wim Schoutens, he co-developed a technique that uses historical data to establish upper and lower valuations, leading to enhanced risk evaluation in the stock market through the integration of risk attributes into required returns.

== Awards and honors ==
- 2006 – Humboldt Research Award, Alexander von Humboldt Foundation
- 2021 – Northfield Financial Engineer of the Year Award, International Association for Quantitative Finance

== Bibliography ==
=== Books ===
- Mathematical Finance – Bachelier Congress 2000 (2002) ISBN 9783540677819
- Structured Products (2008) ISBN 9781904339618
- Stochastic Processes, Finance and Control: A Festschrift in Honor of Robert J Elliott (2012) ISBN 9789814383301
- Applied Conic Finance (2016) ISBN 9781107151697
- Nonlinear Valuation and Non-Gaussian Risks in Finance (2022) ISBN 9781316518090

=== Selected articles ===
- Madan, D. B. and Seneta, E. (1990). The variance gamma (VG) model for share market returns. Journal of Business, 511–524.
- Madan, D. B., Carr, P. P., and Chang, E. C. (1998). The variance gamma process and option pricing. Review of Finance, 2(1), 79–105.
- Carr, P. and Madan, D. B. (1999). Option valuation using the fast Fourier transform. Journal of Computational Finance, 2(4), 61–73.
- Carr, P., Geman, H., Madan, D. B., and Yor, M. (2002). The fine structure of asset returns: An empirical investigation. The Journal of Business, 75(2), 305–332.
- Bakshi, G., Kapadia, N., and Madan, D. B. (2003). Stock return characteristics, skew laws, and the differential pricing of individual equity options. The Review of Financial Studies, 16(1), 101–143.
- Carr, P., Geman, H., Madan D. B., and Yor, M. (2007). Self-Decomposability and Option Pricing. Mathematical Finance 17, 31-57.
- Cherny, A. and Madan, D. B. (2009). New Measures of Performance Evaluation. Review of Financial Studies. 12, 213–230.
- Eberlein, E., Madan, D. B., Pistorius, M., and Yor, M. (2014). Bid and Ask Prices as Non-Linear Continuous Time G-Expectations Based on Distortions. Mathematics and Financial Economics 8, 265–289.
- Elliott, R. J., Madan, D. B., and Wang, K. (2022). High Dimensional Markovian Trading of a Single Stock. Frontiers of Mathematical Finance 1, 375–396.
