= Rebalancing investments =

Portfolio rebalancing in finance

In finance and investing, rebalancing of investments (or constant mix) is a strategy of bringing a portfolio that has deviated away from one's target asset allocation back into line. This can be implemented by transferring assets, that is, selling investments of an asset class that is overweight and using the money to buy investments in a class that is underweight, but it also applies to adding or removing money from a portfolio, that is, putting new money into an underweight class, or making withdrawals from an overweight class.

== History ==
Now a commonplace strategy, rebalancing can be traced back to the 1940s and was pioneered by Sir John Templeton, among others. Templeton used an early version of the cyclically adjusted price-to-earnings ratio to estimate valuations for the overall U.S. stock market. Based on the theory that high stock valuations led to lower expected return on investment over the next few years, Templeton allocated a greater percentage of a portfolio to stocks when valuations were low, and a higher percentage of the portfolio to bonds and cash when valuations became elevated.

== Rebalancing to control risk ==
The investments in a portfolio will perform according to the market. As time goes on, a portfolio's current asset allocation will drift away from an investor's original target asset allocation (i.e., their preferred level of risk exposure). If left unadjusted, the portfolio will either become too risky, or too conservative. If it becomes too risky, that will tend to increase long-term returns, which is desirable. But when the excessive risks show up in the short term, the investor might have a tendency to do the worst possible thing at the worst possible time (i.e., sell at the bottom), thus diminishing their ending wealth. If the portfolio is allowed to drift to a too conservative status, then excessive short-term risk is less likely, which is desirable. However, long-term returns would also tend to be lower than desired. It is best to maintain a portfolio's risk profile reasonably close to an investor's level of risk tolerance.

The goal of rebalancing is to move the current asset allocation back in line to the originally planned asset allocation. This rebalancing strategy is specifically known as a constant-mix strategy and is one of the four main dynamic strategies for asset allocation. The other three strategies are 1) buy and hold, 2) constant proportion and 3) option-based portfolio insurance.

== Rebalancing bonus ==
The promise of higher returns from rebalancing to a static asset allocation was introduced by William J. Bernstein in 1996. Bernstein's proposal has since been shown to only exist under certain situations that investors are not able to predict. At other times rebalancing can reduce returns. It is commonly agreed that:

- A potential rebalancing bonus is determined by two assets' relative variances and covariance. These metrics are developed by averaging historical returns, which are no guarantee of future results in the short term or long term. E.g. debt is traditionally thought to be negatively correlated to equities, but during the 'Great Moderation' they were positively correlated.
- The bonus would be maximized by a 50:50 weighting between the two assets. But that is not to say any particular portfolio should have that weighting.
- The bonus is greater when each asset's price swings widely, so that each rebalancing creates an entry point at a very low cost relative to the trend. But that is not to say price volatility is a desirable attribute of any asset.
- The bonus is greater when the prices of both assets are increasing at roughly the same trend rate of return. If one asset's growth is much lower, each rebalancing would push money from the winning asset into the losing (or lesser return) asset.
- The bonus is greater when returns are negatively correlated and revert to their mean on the same cycle as the rebalancing takes place.

According to some observers, constant-mix rebalancing strategy will outperform all other strategies in oscillating markets. Similarly, it is argued a buy-and-hold rebalancing strategy will outperform in up-trending markets.

== Rebalancing strategies ==
There are several rebalancing strategies:

- Buy and hold
- Constant proportion portfolio insurance
- Constant mix
- Maximizing Sharpe ratio

Some say that the exact choice is probably not too important, as long as the rebalancing is performed consistently. Some say otherwise, such as:

- Rebalancing every year:

Rebalancing at exactly the same time each year is easy to remember.
(Note: sale of an asset is qualified for "long-term" capital gain or loss, if the asset has been held for 12 months or longer in the United States. Special tax treatments come with the long-term gain or loss.)

- Rebalancing when current allocation is 5% off from target asset allocation:

Touch nothing except when allocation is off noticeably.

- Rebalance using contributions or withdrawals:

Buy underweighted assets when contributing and sell overweighted assets when withdrawing. This minimizes transaction costs. The contributed or withdrawn amount can be divided across assets in an optimal way that avoids overshooting and minimizes deviation from the target allocation.

Also

- Rebalance Symmetrically whereby allocations across assets or asset categories are traded back to target.
- Rebalance Asymmetrically whereby allocations are only traded where Assets or categories breach tolerances around a target - this is a Transaction Cost Sensitive approach.

Rob Arnott developed a theory of "over-rebalancing". For example, if a portfolio had a target allocation 60/40 split of stocks/bonds, and the allocation shifted to 65/35, over-rebalancing would recommend adjusting to a 55/45 split of stocks/bonds rather than a 60/40 split. His research indicates over-rebalancing might add up to 2% per year, due to the contrarian strategy of buying disproportionately more of temporarily under-valued assets which will eventually recover.

== See also ==
- Asset allocation
- Merton's portfolio problem
