= Merton model =

Model that values credit risk using option-based default mechanics

The Merton model, is a widely used "structural" credit risk model, which was developed by American economist Robert C. Merton in 1974.

Analysts and investors utilize the Merton model to estimate how capable a company is at meeting financial obligations, servicing its debt, and weighing the general possibility that it will go into credit default. The Merton model provides an intuitive way to estimate a firm's default risk by relating its debt and asset value, but its accuracy is limited by simplifying assumptions about how firms and financial markets behave and the Merton model is more accurate when combined with other analytical tools.

== Approach ==
Under this model, the value of stock equity is modeled as a call option on the value of the whole company – i.e. including the liabilities – struck at the nominal value of the liabilities; and the equity market value thus depends on the volatility of the market value of the company assets. The idea applied is that, in general, equity may be viewed as a call option on the firm: since the principle of limited liability protects equity investors, shareholders would choose not to repay the firm's debt where the value of the firm is less than the value of the outstanding debt; where firm value is greater than debt value, the shareholders would choose to repay – i.e. exercise their option – and not to liquidate. See Business valuation § Option pricing approaches and Valuation (finance) § Valuation of a suffering company.

This is the first example of a "structural model", where bankruptcy is modeled using a microeconomic model of the firm's capital structure. Structural models are distinct from "reduced form models" – such as Jarrow–Turnbull – where bankruptcy is modeled as a statistical process. By contrast, the Merton model treats bankruptcy as a continuous probability of default, where, on the random occurrence of default, the stock price of the defaulting company is assumed to go to zero. This microeconomic approach, to some extent, allows us to answer the question "what are the economic causes of default?" Large financial institutions employ default models of both the structural and reduced-form types.

=== Mathematical formulation ===
In the basic Merton model, the firm has assets with current market value $V_0$ and constant volatility $\sigma_V$, and has issued a single zero-coupon bond requiring a payment of $D$ at time $T$. The model assumes that no payments are made to shareholders before the debt matures. Under the risk-neutral measure, the value of the firm's assets follows the process

$$dV_t = rV_t\,dt + \sigma_V V_t\,dW_t,$$

where $r$ is the continuously compounded risk-free interest rate and $W_t$ is a Wiener process. In the basic model, default can occur only at maturity. If $V_T < D$, the firm defaults, the bondholders receive the firm's assets and the shareholders receive nothing. If $V_T \geq D$, the debt is repaid and the shareholders receive the residual value. Thus, if $E_T$ and $B_T$ denote the values of equity and debt at maturity,

$$E_T = \max(V_T-D,0),$$

and

$$B_T = \min(V_T,D)=D-\max(D-V_T,0).$$

Equity is therefore equivalent to a European call option on the firm's assets with exercise price $D$, while risky debt is equivalent to default-free debt minus a European put option on the firm's assets.

Assuming no payouts from the firm's assets before maturity, the Black–Scholes–Merton formula gives the current market value of equity as

$$E_0 = V_0N(d_1)-De^{-rT}N(d_2),$$

where

$$d_1=\frac{\ln(V_0/D)+(r+\tfrac{1}{2}\sigma_V^2)T}{\sigma_V\sqrt{T}},$$

$$d_2=d_1-\sigma_V\sqrt{T},$$

and $N(\cdot)$ is the cumulative distribution function of the standard normal distribution. The current market value of the firm's debt is consequently

$$B_0=V_0-E_0
=V_0N(-d_1)+De^{-rT}N(d_2).$$

The model-implied risk-neutral probability of default is

$$\Pr_{\mathbb Q}(V_T<D)=N(-d_2).$$

In this formulation, $d_2$ is also commonly interpreted as the firm's distance to default: as $d_2$ decreases, the model-implied probability of default increases.

Neither $V_0$ nor $\sigma_V$ is directly observable. For a publicly traded company, however, the market value of equity $E_0$ and equity volatility $\sigma_E$ can be observed or estimated. Applying Itô's lemma to the equity value gives

$$\sigma_E E_0=N(d_1)\sigma_VV_0.$$

This equation and the equity valuation equation above form a pair of simultaneous nonlinear equations that can be solved for $V_0$ and $\sigma_V$. The resulting estimates can then be used to calculate $d_2$ and the model-implied probability of default.

== KMV Model ==
The practical implementation of Merton’s model has received much attention in the years around 2013. One adaption is the KMV Model (Stephen Kealhofer, John McQuown and Oldřich Vašíček) now offered through Moody's Investors Service. The KMV Model modifies the original in defining the probability of default - or "Expected Default Frequency" - as a function of the "Distance to Default", being the difference between the expected asset value at the analysis horizon and the "default point" normalized by the standard deviation of (future) asset returns. This default point, in turn, is not simply all debt as above, rather, it is the sum of all short term debt and half the long term debt.

== See also ==
- Capital structure substitution theory § Asset pricing
- Credit default swap
- Credit derivatives
- Credit risk
- Equity (finance) § Valuation
- Jarrow–Turnbull model
- Probability of default
