= Stephen Ross (economist) =

American economist

- Born: February 3, 1944; Boston, Massachusetts
- Died: March 3, 2017 (aged 73)

Academic work
- Discipline: Financial economics
- School or tradition: Neoclassical economics
- Notable ideas: Arbitrage pricing theory Binomial options pricing model Cox–Ingersoll–Ross model Agency problem
- Awards: Smith Breeden Prize (2006); Onassis Prize (2012); Deutsche Bank Prize (2015)

Stephen Alan "Steve" Ross (February 3, 1944 – March 3, 2017) was the inaugural Franco Modigliani Professor of Financial Economics at the MIT Sloan School of Management after a long career as the Sterling Professor of Economics and Finance at the Yale School of Management. He is known for initiating several important theories and models in financial economics. He was a widely published author in finance and economics, and was a coauthor of a best-selling Corporate Finance textbook.

He received his BS with honors from Caltech in 1965 where he majored in physics, and his PhD in economics from Harvard in 1970, and taught at the University of Pennsylvania, Yale School of Management, and MIT.

Ross is best known for the development of the arbitrage pricing theory (mid-1970s) as well as for his role in developing the binomial options pricing model (1979; also known as the Cox–Ross–Rubinstein model). He was an initiator of the fundamental financial concept of risk-neutral pricing. In 1985 he contributed to the creation of the Cox–Ingersoll–Ross model for interest rate dynamics. Such theories have become an important part of the paradigm known as neoclassical finance.

Ross also introduced a rigorous modeling of the agency problem in 1973, as seen from the principal's standpoint.

Ross served as president of the American Finance Association in 1988. He was named International Association of Financial Engineers' Financial Engineer of the Year in 1996.

He gave the inaugural lecture of the Princeton Lectures in Finance, sponsored by the Bendheim Center for Finance of Princeton University, in 2001. It became a book in 2004, presenting neoclassical finance and defending it, including such notions as the efficiency and rationality of markets, against its critics, especially those who belong to the behavioral finance tradition.

Ross was a recipient of a 2006 Smith Breeden Prize, a 2012 Onassis Prize, a 2014 Morgan Stanley - AFA Award for Excellence in Finance, as well as a 2015 Deutsche Bank Prize for developing models used for assessing prices for options and other assets in the previous 30 years.

Ross chaired the theses of a number of prominent economists, including John Y. Campbell, Douglas Diamond, Philip H. Dybvig, and William N. Goetzmann. Two of his students, Douglas Diamond and Philip H. Dybvig, won the Nobel Memorial Prize in Economic Sciences in 2022.
