= Barron's 400 Index =

American stock market index

The Barron's 400 Index or B400 is a stock market index of 400 public companies in the United States, as selected by editors and associates of Barron's magazine. Established in 2007, the Barron's 400 has tended to outperform certain other major indexes as of June 2013.

== Summary ==
The index is equal-weighted, aiming to hold each of 400 companies in equal proportion of about a quarter percent of the overall index. This differs from other major indexes, like the Dow Jones US Total Stock Market Index, the NASDAQ Composite, and the Standard & Poor's 500 (S&P 500), which are capitalization-weighted. In that respect it also differs from the Dow Jones Industrial Average, which is calculated as the average of the share prices of the underlying components.

The index selects companies based on fundamental analysis criteria such as Return on investment, growth, market value, profits and cash flow. The Barron's 400 employs a consistent growth-at-a-reasonable price (GARP) selection strategy.

The Barron's 400 is compiled, maintained and updated by MarketGrader.com Corp. MarketGrader developed the Barron's 400 in consultation with editors at Barron's, a financial news magazine. The two companies continue to maintain an ongoing partnership for the index. The index is calculated by NYSE/Euronext.

== History ==
The B400 was first calculated on June 25, 2007. Its estimated back-tested history availability dates to December 31, 1997, which is also the index's base value date. The index was first published in Barron's on September 3, 2007, and was the subject of the magazine's cover story on that date.

The B400 hit an all-time closing high of 451.40 on July 22, 2013, during an extended broader bull market that commenced in March 2009.

The B400's peak annual return through 2012, excluding its back-tested history, came in 2009, when the index gained 39.1%. The B400's worst annual performance through 2012 came in 2008, when it sank 40.0% during a general broad market meltdown provoked by the collapse of the U.S. real estate market that spread to the wider economy.

As of 5 July 2013, the B400 had a cumulative 10-year price-only return (excluding dividends) of 153.0%, compared to a Dow Jones Industrial Average (DJIA) cumulative return of 62.6%, an S&P 500 return of 60.8%, a NASDAQ return of 100.1% and the Dow Jones Total Stock Market (DJUSTSM) return of 75.2%.for the same time period. The B400 had a 10-year annualized return of 9.9%, compared to a DJIA annualized return of 5.2%, an S&P 500 return of 5.1%, a NASDAQ return of 7.5% and a DJUSTSM return of 6.0% for the same time period.

An updated chart of the B400 has appeared in The Trader section of Barron's magazine since the index's inception.

== Selection ==
The components of the Barron's 400 are selected primarily based on proprietary analytics supplied by MarketGrader that evaluate stocks based on their growth, value, profitability and cash flow.

Stocks under evaluation are assigned a grade based on those four fundamentals. MarketGrader employs a stock-selection process that employs 24 variables to judge the health of a company and the valuation of its shares. It also analyzes a company according to its growth trajectory, whether its stock is cheap or expensive relative to the company's underlying fundamentals, its profit margins, leverage, return on shareholder equity, and the way it grows and manages the cash it generates from operations. The selection process also measure a stock's reaction to the latest earnings reports and the degree to which it may be overlooked by analysts.

The value test for potential inclusion in the B400 takes into consideration a company's capital structure, price-to-book, price-to-cash-flow and price-to-sales ratios; overall market capitalization and price/earnings measures. Profitability is determined by a combination of asset and capital use, operating margins, relative margins, return on equity and quality of revenues. Cash flow is analyzed from cash flow growth, cash flow margin, debt-to-cash-flow ratio; interest coverage capacity, economic value and cash-retention rate.

REITS, although covered by MarketGrader, are excluded from B400. Also excluded companies that have not reported quarterly or annual results within the past six months. Each stock selected for the B400 must have a minimum three-month average daily dollar-trading volume of $2 million. The minimum float-adjusted capitalization of a component is $250 million, and at least 25% of the components must have a market value of at least $3 billion.

All components must be U.S. companies publicly listed on either the New York Stock Exchange or NASDAQ. The components are drawn from the MarketGrader universe of about 6,000 North American stocks. Turnover in the components tends to be high. The median historical turnover pace is 43.5%. The average holding period for a component in the B400 is less than two years.

== Equal weighting ==
All 400 components of the B400 are equally weighted in the index at each semi-annual rebalance. The result prevents a small minority of huge companies from steering the index, while giving smaller issues equal opportunity to contribute to the B400's overall performance. By definition, each stock represents one quarter of one percent of the overall index.

== Components ==
The Barron's 400 Index is updated semi-annually, in March and September. As of March 2013, only 16 companies had been in the index for at least five years.

The companies with the most selections in the B400 since its 1997 inception are Microsoft, Wal-Mart, Amgen, Bed Bath & Beyond, The Home Depot, IBM, Nike, Oracle Corporation, PepsiCo and Apollo Education Group

== Sector breakdown ==
The components of the Barron's 400 Index are drawn from major stock sectors: Consumer Discretionary, Consumer Staples, Energy, Financials, Health Care, Industrials, Technology, Telecommunications and Utilities. The number of stocks from any one sector is limited to 20% of the index.

== Update frequency ==
The B400 index value is updated every 15 seconds during trading sessions and is disseminated by NYSE Euronext.

Every six months, on the third Friday of March and September, the B400 component stocks are updated to incorporate recent financial results and market action, and to revise the index – some stocks are removed and some are added at those times.

The index can be found under the symbol B400.

== Management ==
The Barron's 400 Index is managed by MarketGrader, led by Founder Carlos Diez, who founded the stock research firm in 1999. MarketGrader rates 39,000 equities across 92 countries and 1,500 U.S. listed equity ETFs. MarketGrader also created and publishes a family of equally weighted indexes in addition to the Barron's 400 Index. In May 2013, MarketGrader named former Dow Jones Indexes executive John Prestbo as a senior adviser for the growth and development of the B400.

== Related investment product ==
The Barron's 400 Index is the basis for the Barron's 400 ETF (NYSE Arca: BFOR), an exchange-traded fund (ETF) launched June 4, 2013, under the ALPS ETF Trust. The ETF tracks the index and seeks results corresponding to the underlying B400 index of 400 stocks. ALPS, headquartered in Denver CO, provides asset servicing and gathering to the financial services industry.
