= List of business and finance abbreviations =

This is a list of abbreviations used in a business or financial context.

== 0–9 ==
- 1H – First half of the year
- 24/7 – 24 hours a day, seven days a week
- 80/20 – According to the Pareto principle, for many events, roughly 80% of the effects come from 20% of the causes

== A ==
- ADR – Alternative dispute resolution
- AI – Artificial Intelligence
- AM – Account manager
- AOP – Adjusted operating profit
- AOP – Annual operating plan
- AP – Accounts payable
- AR – Accounts receivable
- ARR – Annual recurring revenue
- ARPU – Average revenue per user
- ASP – Average selling price
- agcy. – Agency
- agt. – Agent
- assoc. – Associate
- asst. – Assistant
- a/c. – Account

== B ==
- BAU – Business as usual
- BEP – Break-even point
- BI – Business intelligence
- BIC – Bank identifier code
- bldg. – Building
- BLS – Balance sheet
- BOM – Bill of materials
- BOL - Bill of lading
- BPO – Business process outsourcing
- BPR – Brief project report
- BPV – Bank payment voucher
- BRD – Business requirements document
- BRU – Business recovery unit
- BRV – Bank receipt voucher
- BTW – By the way
- B2B – Business-to-business
- B2C – Business-to-consumer
- B2G – Business-to-government
- BU – Business unit
- BUSI – Business
- bus. – Business

== C ==
- CAGR – Compound annual growth rate
- CAO – Chief administrative officer or chief accounting officer
- CAPEX – Capital expenditure
- CAPM – Capital asset pricing model
- CBOE – Chicago Board Options Exchange
- CBOT – Chicago Board of Trade
- CDO – Collateralized debt obligation or chief data officer
- CDM – Change and data management
- CDS – Credit default swap
- CEO – Chief executive officer
- COA – Chart of accounts
- CFA – Chartered Financial Analyst
- CFD – Contract for difference
- CFC – Consumption of fixed capital
- CFCT – Cash flow cycle time
- CFM – Certified Financial Manager
- CFO – Chief Financial Officer
- CFS – Consolidated Financial Statement
- CIA – Certified Internal Auditor
- CIF – Cost Insurance With Freight
- CIMA – Chartered Institute of Management Accountants
- CIO – Chief Information Officer, Chief Innovation Officer or Chief Investment Officer
- CIP – Carriage and Insurance Paid
- CISA – Certified Information Systems Auditor
- CISO – Chief Information Security Officer
- CLO – Chief Legal Officer
- CMA – Certified Management Accountant
- CMFB – Committee on monetary, finance and balance of payments statistics
- CMO – Chief Marketing Officer
- COB – Close of Business
- COC – Cost of Credit or Cost of Capital
- COD – Cost of Debt or Cash on Delivery
- COE – Center of Excellence or Cost of Equity
- COGS – Cost of Goods Sold
- Corp. – Corporation
- COO – Chief Operating Officer
- CPA – Certified Public Accountant
- CPI – Consumer Price Index
- CPO – Chief People Officer also Chief Procurement Officer
- CPQ – Configure, Price, Quote
- CPU – Central processing unit
- CSI – Corporate social investment
- CSO – Chief security officer
- CSR – Corporate social responsibility
- CRM – Customer Relationship Management
- CVP – Cost volume profit
- CTA – Call to action
- CTO – Chief technology officer
- CX – Customer experience
- CXO – Any chief officer(s), x being a placeholder.
- C2B – Consumer-to-business
- C2C – Consumer-to-consumer
- C&F – Cost With Freight
- CKM – Customer Knowledge Management
- CTC – Cost to company
- CUSIP number – Committee on Uniform Security Identification Procedures number
- Cr – Credit
- CA – Current Account

== D ==
- DDA – Depletion depreciation amortization
- Dept. – Department
- DI – Dispatch information
- DIFOT – Delivery in full on time, a variant of on time in full
- Dir – Director
- disc. – Discount
- DMA – Direct market access
- DOE – Depending on experience
- DPO – Days payable outstanding
- DR – Depositary receipt
- DSO – Days sales outstanding
- DSP – Delivery service provider
- DTP– Desktop publishing
- DVP – Delivery versus payment

== E ==
- EAR – Effective annual rate
- EAY – Effective annual yield
- EBITA – Earnings before interest and taxes and amortization
- EBITDA – Earnings before interest, taxes, depreciation, and amortization
- ECB – European Central Bank
- ECGC – Export Credit Guarantee Corporation of India
- ECS – Electronic clearing service or electronic clearing system
- EDI – Electronic data interchange
- EFSM – European Financial Stabilisation Mechanism
- EFT – Exchange-traded fund
- EFTPOS – Electronic funds transfer at point of sale
- EIDL – Economic injury disaster loan
- EMI – Equated monthly installment
- EOB – End of business
- EOD – End of day
- EOM – End of message
- EPC – Export Promotion Council
- EPS – Earnings per share
- ERP – Enterprise resource planning
- ESG – Environmental, social, and governance
- ETA – Estimated time of arrival
- ETD – Estimated time of departure or estimated time of delivery
- EXP – Export
- EXW – Ex Works

== F ==
- FAB – Feature advantage benefits
- FDP – Finance department
- FIFO – First in, first out
- FinMin – Finance minister
- Fin Min – Finance minister
- FIX – Financial information exchange
- FL – Financial leverage
- FNF – Full and final
- FOB – Freight on board
- FOMC – Federal Open Market Committee
- FOC – Free of cost
- FP&A – Financial planning & analysis
- FPO – Follow-on public offer
- FSA – Financial services authority
- FTE – Full-time equivalent
- FV – Future value
- FX – Foreign exchange market
- FY – Fiscal year or financial year
- FYA – For your action
- FYI – For your information
- F/U – Follow-up
- FYF Full-year forecast

== G ==
- GAAP – Generally accepted accounting principles
- GAAS – Generally accepted audit standards
- GDP – Gross domestic product
- GDPR – General data protection regulation
- GDR – Global depository receipt
- GFCF – Gross fixed capital formation
- GL – General ledger
- GMV – Gross merchandise volume
- GP – Gross profit
- GPO – Group purchasing organization
- GRN – Goods receipt note
- GRNI – Goods receipt not invoiced
- GSV – Gross sales value
- GVC – Global value chain
- GMROII – Gross margin return on inventory investment
- G&A – General and administration expense

== H ==
- HF – Hedge fund
- HMRC – Her Majesty's Revenue and Customs
- HP – Hire purchase
- HQ – Headquarters
- HR – Human resources
- HRD – Human resource development
- HS Code – Harmonized System commodity code

== I ==
- IAS – International accounting standards
- IB – Investment banking
- IBAN – International Bank Account Number
- ICB – Industry Classification Benchmark
- ICRM – Innovative Customer Relationship Management
- IE – Interest expense
- IFRS – International Financial Reporting Standards
- ILCLP – IdentLogic Systems customer loyalty program
- IMF – International Monetary Fund
- IMP – Import
- Inc. – Incorporated
- IoT – Internet of things
- IPO – Initial public offering
- IPT – Item per transaction
- IR – Interest rate – typically referring to an IR derivative product
- IRS – Internal Revenue Service
- IRR – Internal rate of return
- ISIN – International Securities Identification Number
- ISM – Institute for Supply Management
- ITT – Invitation to tender
- IYR – In year revenue

== J ==
- J – Journal
- JIT – Just in time
- JIS – Just in sequence
- JST – Joint supervisory team
- JV – Joint venture

== K ==
- K – Is used as an abbreviation for 1,000. For example, $225K would be understood to mean $225,000, and $3.6K would be understood to mean $3,600. Multiple K's are not commonly used to represent larger numbers. In other words, it would look odd to use $1.2KK to represent $1,200,000.
- Ke – Is used as an abbreviation for cost of equity (COE). Ke is the risk-adjusted, theoretical rate of return on a company's invested excess capital obtained through external investments. Among other things, the value of Ke and the cost of debt (COD) enables management to arbitrate different forms of short and long term financing for various types of expenditures. Ke applies most prominently to companies that regularly generate excess capital (free cash flow, cash on hand) from ongoing operations. Critically, in assessing a company's financial position (and reading its balance sheet), COE is distinguished from CAPEX, or costs associated with Capital Expenditures. Ke is most often used in the capital asset pricing model (CAPM), in which Ke = Rf + ß(Rm-Rf). In this equation, Ke (COE) equals the anticipated return from the difference (Beta) of investment yields from a return based on market expectations (Rm) and a Risk Free Rate (Rf), such as Treasury Bills or Bonds.
- KIBOR – Karachi Interbank Offered Rate
- KPI – Key performance indicator, a type of performance measurement. An organization may use KPIs to evaluate its success, or to evaluate the success of a particular activity in which it is engaged.
- KYC – "Know your customer" refers to due diligence activities that financial institutions and other regulated companies must perform to ascertain relevant information.

== L ==
- LBO – Leveraged buyout
- LC – Letter of credit
- LIBOR – London Interbank Offered Rate
- LE – Latest estimate
- LIFFE – London International Financial Futures and Options Exchange
- LIFO – Last in, first out
- LLC – Limited liability company
- LME – London Metal Exchange
- LMS – Learning management system
- Ltd. – Limited company
- LTV – Loan to value
- LOC – Lines of credit
- LOI – Letter of intent
- LoU – Letters of undertaking
- LY – Last year

== M ==
- MBS – Mortgage-backed security
- mfg. – Manufacturing
- MGMT – Management
- MIC – Market Identifier Code
- MiFID – Markets in Financial Instruments Directive
- MILE – Maximum impact, little effort
- MoM – Month-on-month / month-over-month
- MOQ – Minimum order quantity
- MOU – Memorandum of understanding
- MPC – Marginal propensity to consume
- MRO – Maintenance, repair, and operations
- MRP – Maximum retail price
- MSOD – Monthly statement of select operational data
- MSRP – Manufacturer's suggested retail price
- MTD – Month-to-date
- MWC – Managerial working capital
- MPR – Monthly progress report
- MTM – Mark to market

== N ==
- NAV – Net asset value
- NCBO – No change of beneficial ownership
- NCND – Non-circumvent and non-disclosure
- NDA – Non-disclosure agreement
- NIAS – Net income attributable to shareholders
- NII – Net interest income
- NIM – Net interest margin
- NNTO – No need to open
- NOA – Net operating assets
- NOI – Net operating income
- NOPAT – Net operating profit after tax
- NPA – Non-performing asset
- NPL – Non-performing loan
- NPV – Net present value
- NTE – Not to exceed
- NYMEX – New York Mercantile Exchange
- NYSE – New York Stock Exchange
- NFO − New fund offer

== O ==
- OC – Opportunity cost
- OCF – Operating cash flow
- OECD – Organisation for Economic Co-operation and Development
- OEM – Original equipment manufacturer
- OIBDA – Operating income before depreciation and amortization
- OKR – Objectives and key results
- OOF – Out of facility, used interchangeably with out of office and originating from the Microsoft Xenix mail system
- OOO – Out of office
- OPEX – Operating expenditure or operational expenditure
- OTIF – On time in full
- OTC – Over-the-counter (finance)

== P ==
- P&L – Profit and loss
- P2B – Platform to business
- PA – Personal assistant
- PA – Promotional Activity
- PA – Purchasing agent
- PAT – Profit after tax
- PBT – Profit before tax
- P/E – Price-to-earnings ratio
- PE – Private equity
- PEG – Price-to-earnings growth ratio
- PHEK – Planherstellungskosten (product planning cost)
- PFI – Private finance initiative
- PI or PII – Professional indemnity (insurance coverage)
- PII – Personally identifiable information
- pip – Percentage in point
- pip – Periodic investment plan
- PM – Portfolio manager
- PMAC – Period moving average cost
- PO – Profit objective
- PO – Purchase order
- POA – Plan of action
- POS – Point of sale
- PP&E – Property, plant, and equipment
- PPI - Producer price index
- PPP – Public-private partnership
- PPP – Purchasing power parity
- PR – Purchase requisition
- PSP – Profit sharing plan
- PTC – Private trust company
- PTD – Project to date
- PLR – Prime lending rate
- POC – Point of contact
- PIC – Person in charge
- PWIN – Percent win (a measure of performance of capture when bidding for contracts with a targeted customer base such as bidding for government contracts)
- PWP – Personal wealth portfolio

== Q ==
- Q1, Q2, Q3, Q4 – quarters of the accounting year, calendar year or fiscal year
- QC – Quality control or quality costs
- QoQ – Quarter on quarter
- QPR – Quarterly performance report
- QRP – Qualified retirement plan
- q/q – Quarter on quarter
- QTD – Quarter-to-date

== R ==
- RAQSCI – Regulatory, assurance of supply, quality, service, cost, innovation
- RBI – Reserve Bank of India
- RBA – Reserve Bank of Australia
- RE – Retained earnings
- REIT – Real estate investment trust
- RFI – Request for information
- RFP – Request for proposal
- RFQ – Request for quotation
- RFX – Generic name for a request for information, proposal, or quotation
- RMD – Required minimum distribution
- R/O – Rollover
- ROA – Return on assets
- ROB – Return on brand
- ROC – Registration of company
- ROCE – Return on capital employed
- ROE – Return on equity
- ROI – Return on investment
- ROIC – Return on invested capital
- RONA – Return on net assets
- ROS – Return on sales
- RR – Resource rent
- RSP – Retail selling price
- RWA – Risk-weighted asset
- R&D – Research and development
- RC – Retail company

== S ==
- S_{t} – Sales, during time period t.
- S&M – Sales & marketing
- SLR – Statutory liquidity ratio
- S&OP – Sales and operations planning
- SAAS – Software as a service
- SAM – Strategic asset management, or software asset management
- SBU – Strategic business unit
- SBLC – Stand by letter of credit
- SCM – Supply chain management
- SCBA – Social cost benefit analysis
- SEBI – Securities and Exchange Board of India
- SEC – Securities and Exchange Commission
- SEDOL – Stock Exchange Daily Official List
- SF – Structured finance
- SG&A – Sales, general, and administrative expenses
- SIMPLE – Savings incentive match plan for employees
- SIOP – Sales inventory and operations plan
- SIR – Stores issuance requisition
- SIV – Structured investment vehicle
- SKU – Stock keeping unit
- SLA – Service level agreement
- SMA – Separately managed account
- SME – Small and medium enterprises
- SOHO – Small office/home office
- SOP – Standard operating procedure
- SOW – Statement of work
- SOX – Sarbanes–Oxley
- SPP – Systematic payment plan
- SROI – Social return on investment
- SSN – Social security number
- Stg – Sterling, the currency of the United Kingdom
- STP – Situation target proposal or situation target path
- SUA – Start up agreement
- SWM – Strategic wealth management
- SWIP – Systematic withdrawal from investment plan
- SWOT – Strengths, weaknesses, opportunities, threats

== T ==
- TAM – Total addressable market
- TBA – To be announced
- TB – Transaction banking
- TBC – To be completed or To be confirmed
- TBD – To be defined or to be determined
- TCO – Total cost of ownership
- TCV – Total contract value
- TOTW – Time off for time worked
- TQM – Total quality management
- TSR – Total shareholder return
- TTM – Trailing twelve months
- TVM – Time value of money
- Ts & Cs – Terms and conditions

== U ==
- USP – Unique selling proposition
- UPI – Unified payment interface

== V ==
- VAD – Value-added distributor
- VaR – Value at risk
- VAR – Value-added reseller
- VAT – Value-added tax
- VC – Venture capital
- VP – Vice president

== W ==
- WACC – Weighted average cost of capital
- WC – Working capital
- WFH – Work from home
- wk – week
- wrk – work
- wo – work order
- WOGs – With other goods
- WIGs – Wildly important goals
- wasp – weighted average selling price
- WLL – With limited liability
- w.r.t – with respect to
- WTI – West Texas Intermediate
- WVN – Withdraw voucher note
- WHT – Withholding tax
- WTO – World Trade Organization
- WTD – Week-to-date
- WW – World wide

== Y ==
- YTD – Year-to-date
- YTG – Year-to-go
- YOY – Year-over-year
- YTC – Yet-to-confirm
- YEJ – Year-ending-June

== Z ==
- ZBB – Zero-based budgeting
- zcyc – Zero coupon yield curve
- ZOPA – Zone of possible agreement
