= Return on tangible equity =

Measure of rate of return on equity

Return on Tangible Equity (ROTE) is a financial performance metric that measures a company's profitability relative to its tangible common equity. Unlike Return on Equity, ROE, which includes intangible assets such as goodwill, ROTE focuses solely on the tangible portion of shareholders' equity, excluding intangible assets and preferred equity. This makes ROTE particularly useful for evaluating financial institutions and other asset-heavy businesses where intangible assets may distort traditional equity-based returns. It is calculated by dividing net income attributable to common shareholders by average tangible common equity over a given period. ROTE is often used by investors and analysts to assess how effectively a company is generating profits from its core, tangible capital base, offering a clearer view of operational efficiency and risk-adjusted returns. It is also referred to as Return on average Tangible Common shareholders' Equity, ROTCE.

== Definition and Formula ==
Return on Tangible Equity (ROTE) is a financial ratio that measures a company's net income attributable to common shareholders as a percentage of its average tangible common equity. Tangible common equity refers to shareholders' equity excluding preferred equity, goodwill, and other intangible assets. This metric is commonly used to assess the profitability of financial institutions, where intangible assets may significantly affect traditional equity-based measures.

The formula for calculating ROTE is:

$$ROTE = \frac{\text{Net Income Attributable to Common Shareholders}}{\text{Average Tangible Common Equity}}$$

Net Income Attributable to Common Shareholders is the profit after taxes and preferred dividends.

Average Tangible Common Equity is typically calculated as the average of monthly or quarterly tangible equity balances over the reporting period.

ROTE is often annualized when used in quarterly financial reports. It provides a clearer view of a company's return on its core capital base, especially in industries where acquisitions and goodwill can distort traditional return metrics such as Return on Equity, ROE.

== History ==
The use of ROTE as a financial metric gained prominence in the early 2000s, particularly within the banking and financial services sectors. Its adoption was driven by the need for a more transparent and risk-sensitive measure of profitability that excluded intangible assets such as goodwill, which can distort traditional return metrics like Return on Equity (ROE). ROTE became especially relevant following the 2008 financial crisis when investors and regulators began scrutinizing banks' capital structures more closely. Intangible assets, often inflated through acquisitions, were seen as less reliable in assessing a firm’s true financial strength. By focusing on tangible equity, ROTE offered a clearer view of how effectively a company was generating returns from its core capital base.

In the years that followed, major banks began reporting ROTE alongside ROE in their annual reports and investor presentations. A 2023 study by Tim Sutton highlighted the widespread use of ROTE in the financial disclosures of leading European and North American banks, despite inconsistencies in its calculation methods. The study also noted that while ROTE lacks a standardized formula, its popularity stems from its perceived alignment with regulatory capital measures and its utility in comparing firms with different acquisition histories.

ROTE has since evolved into a benchmark metric for analysts and investors, particularly in evaluating banks and insurance companies. Its continued relevance is underscored by its strong correlation with share price performance and investor expectations, with returns above 10% often viewed as a sign of robust financial health.

== Applications ==
ROTE is widely used in the financial services industry, particularly by banks, insurance companies, and other asset-intensive institutions. It serves as a key performance indicator for assessing how efficiently a company generates profits from its tangible capital base.

Financial analysts and investors often prefer ROTE over ROE when evaluating firms with significant intangible assets, such as goodwill resulting from mergers and acquisitions. By excluding these intangibles, ROTE provides a clearer view of a company's core profitability and operational efficiency.

ROTE is commonly reported in quarterly and annual financial disclosures, especially by large banks. Institutions such as JPMorgan Chase, HSBC, and Citigroup include ROTE in their investor presentations and earnings reports to highlight returns on shareholder capital that are not influenced by accounting treatments of intangible assets.

Regulators and rating agencies may also consider ROTE when assessing the financial health and risk profile of banks. A consistently high ROTE is often interpreted as a sign of strong management performance and effective capital utilization.

In practice, ROTE is used for:

- Benchmarking profitability across peer institutions.
- Evaluating the impact of strategic decisions, such as acquisitions.
- Supporting investor communications and equity valuation models.
- Aligning executive compensation with shareholder value creation.

Despite its usefulness, ROTE is not standardized across firms, and calculation methods may vary. This limits its comparability and requires careful interpretation when used in cross-company analysis.

== Criticism and limitations ==
Return on tangible equity has been criticised for several reasons. Because the measure excludes intangible assets such as goodwill, trademarks, and software, it can understate the value of firms in industries where intangibles represent a substantial share of total assets. This narrow scope makes the ratio particularly suited to banks and insurers, but less informative for technology, pharmaceutical, or service‑oriented companies. Analysts have also noted that ROTE can be distorted by accounting adjustments: when firms write down or impair intangible assets, the denominator of the ratio falls, which can make profitability appear stronger even if underlying performance has not improved. In addition, the ratio is not widely reported outside the financial sector, limiting its usefulness for cross‑industry comparisons. Like other return metrics, ROTE is also focused on short‑term profitability relative to equity and does not capture long‑term strategic investments, risk exposures, or sustainability considerations. For these reasons, commentators often recommend that ROTE be interpreted alongside other measures such as return on equity, return on assets, or economic value added to a more comprehensive view of financial performance.

== See also ==
- Return on assets – Measure of how profitable a company's assets are in generating revenue
- Return on capital employed – Financial measure for comparing profitability
- Return on invested capital – Measure of profitability relative to invested capital
- Book value – Value of an asset according to its balance sheet account balance
- Economic value added – Value of a firm's profit after deduction of capital costs
- Basel III – Banking regulation framework
- Stress test (financial) – Simulation of a financial asset or institution under crisis conditions
- DuPont analysis – Expression which breaks ROE (return on equity) into three parts
- Financial statement analysis – Method of analysing financial statements for decision-making
