= Solvency ratio =

Financial ratio assessing long-term financial soundness

A solvency ratio is a financial ratio used to assess an organisation's ability to meet its longer-term obligations and remain financially sound over time. Solvency ratios are used in financial statement analysis to understand leverage and long-term funding capacity, and are also used in regulated sectors as part of supervisory monitoring of financial soundness.

The term is used in corporate finance, insurance regulation and pension funding, and the exact definition depends on the context, the accounting basis and, for regulated sectors, the jurisdiction.

In corporate finance, solvency ratios are commonly presented as debt ratios and coverage ratios, comparing debt or liabilities with assets or equity, and earnings with interest and other fixed charges.

In insurance, solvency measures often compare eligible regulatory capital with a required capital amount under a prudential regime such as Solvency II in the European Union.

In defined benefit pension schemes, solvency measures may compare scheme assets with liabilities calculated on a specified valuation basis, including an insurance buyout basis.

== Definition and scope ==
In accounting and financial analysis, solvency describes whether an organisation can meet its long-term obligations and remain in business. Liquidity refers to the ability to convert assets into cash to meet short-term cash needs. In banking, solvency and liquidity risks can interact, and some sources refer to a bank's solvency ratio as capital relative to risk-weighted assets.

The phrase "solvency ratio" is not standardised. In corporate financial statement analysis it may refer to a group of ratios that focus on leverage and the capacity to meet long-term debt obligations, rather than a single universally used formula.

Common uses of the term "solvency ratio"
Context	What is being compared	Typical examples	Notes
Corporate finance	Debt or liabilities relative to assets or equity, and earnings relative to interest and other fixed charges.	Debt ratio, debt-to-equity ratio, interest coverage ratios (for example, times interest earned).	Sources may treat "solvency ratios" as a category of measures rather than a single standard ratio.
Banking supervision	Regulatory capital relative to risk-weighted assets, and Tier 1 capital relative to total exposures.	Capital adequacy ratios (for example, regulatory capital to risk-weighted assets), leverage ratio (Tier 1 capital divided by an exposure measure).	Terminology differs between supervision, financial stability analysis and corporate financial statement analysis, and some sources use "solvency ratio" for a bank capital ratio.
Insurance regulation	Eligible regulatory capital relative to a required capital amount set by the prudential regime.	Under Solvency II, SCR coverage ratio (eligible own funds divided by the Solvency Capital Requirement) and MCR coverage ratio are commonly reported.	Definitions and disclosure can vary by jurisdiction and regime.
Pension plan funding	Scheme assets relative to liabilities calculated on a specified valuation basis.	Funding level (assets divided by liabilities). In some regimes, a "solvency ratio" is defined on a termination or wind-up basis.	Different valuation bases can produce materially different results, which limits comparability.

In regulated sectors, a "solvency ratio" may have a specific meaning set by a supervisory framework. For example, Solvency II is the prudential regime for insurance and reinsurance undertakings in the European Union and includes quantitative requirements on valuation and capital that are used to assess overall solvency. More generally, methodologies for solvency and liquidity indicators are often specified in sector guidance, such as the IMF's compilation guidance for financial soundness indicators for financial institutions.

== Corporate finance usage ==
In financial statement analysis, solvency ratios are used to assess how a business is financed and its capacity to meet longer-term debt obligations. In this context, "solvency ratios" commonly refers to a group of measures rather than a single standardised ratio.

Corporate-finance solvency ratios typically include debt ratios and coverage ratios. Debt ratios describe capital structure by relating debt or liabilities to assets or equity, while coverage ratios compare earnings or operating profit with interest and other fixed charges.

Common examples include the debt ratio (total liabilities divided by total assets), leverage (debt divided by shareholders' equity) and a gearing ratio defined as debt divided by the sum of debt and shareholders' equity. A widely used coverage measure is interest cover, which compares operating profit before interest and tax with interest expense.

These ratios are usually interpreted by comparing results over time and against peers, since what counts as high or low leverage can differ across industries and business models.

== Banking and financial institutions usage ==
In banking supervision and financial stability analysis, solvency is commonly monitored using capital adequacy ratios that compare regulatory capital with risk-weighted assets. Basel III includes a leverage ratio that compares Tier 1 capital with a broad measure of on- and off-balance-sheet exposures, intended as a non-risk-based backstop to risk-weighted capital measures.

The IMF's core set of financial soundness indicators for deposit takers includes capital adequacy measures such as regulatory capital to risk-weighted assets and Tier 1 capital to risk-weighted assets, which are used in financial stability monitoring and stress testing. Some sources use the term "solvency ratio" for banks to refer to a capital ratio, such as bank capital divided by risk-weighted assets.

== Insurance and reinsurance usage ==
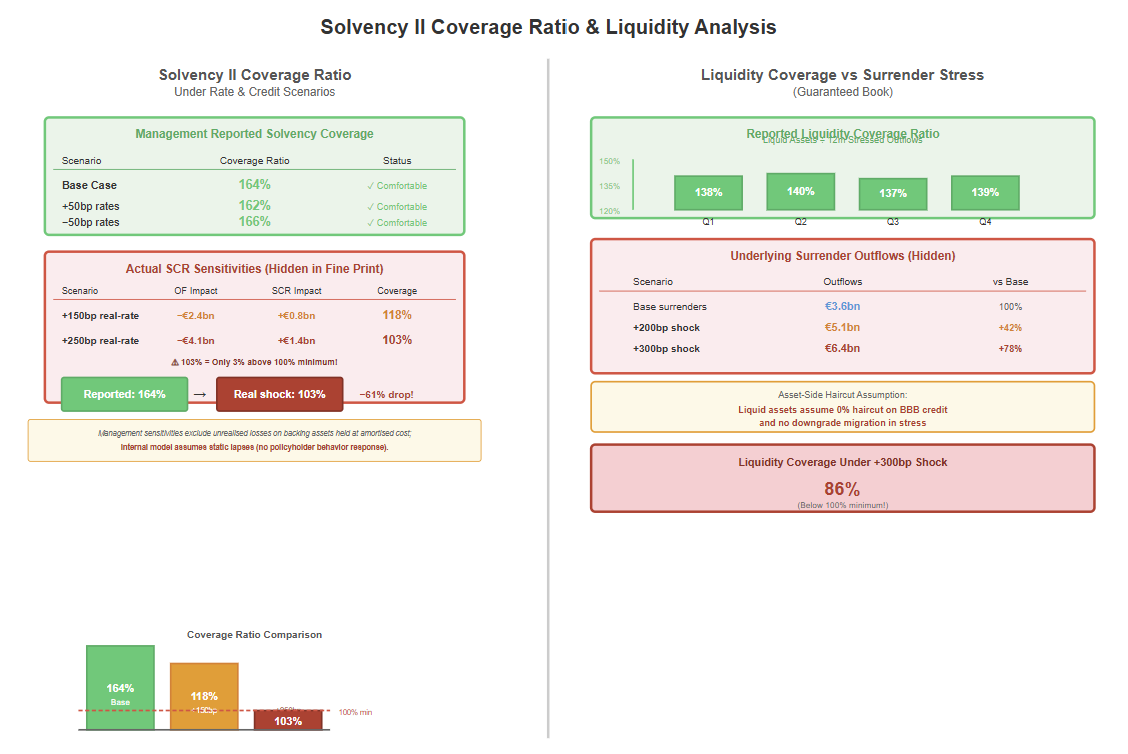
Illustrative example of an insurance solvency coverage ratio (eligible own funds divided by a capital requirement) and selected stress sensitivities.

In insurance regulation, solvency ratios are generally used as indicators of capital adequacy, comparing an insurer's eligible regulatory capital with a required capital amount set by the applicable prudential framework.

Under Solvency II in the European Union, a commonly reported measure is the SCR coverage ratio, calculated as eligible own funds divided by the Solvency Capital Requirement (SCR), and expressed as a percentage. EIOPA's published insurance statistics report eligible own funds relative to the SCR and the Minimum Capital Requirement (MCR).

In the United States, the National Association of Insurance Commissioners describes a capital sufficiency measure as the ratio of total adjusted capital to authorised control level risk-based capital (RBC). In Switzerland, FINMA's Swiss Solvency Test assesses the capitalisation of insurance companies and states that the solvency requirement is met when risk-bearing capital exceeds target capital. In Australia, the Australian Prudential Regulation Authority sets capital adequacy standards for general insurers and requires reporting of a prescribed capital amount used for prudential oversight.

Some jurisdictions define solvency ratios and supervisory thresholds in regulation. For example, the Insurance Regulatory and Development Authority of India (Assets, Liabilities, and Solvency Margin of General Insurers) Regulations, 2015 define the solvency ratio as the available solvency margin divided by the required solvency margin, and define a "control level of solvency" as a breach where the solvency ratio falls below 150%.

== Pension plan funding usage ==
For a defined benefit pension scheme, a common way of summarising the funding position is to compare the market value of scheme assets with the value of liabilities calculated on a specified valuation basis, expressed as a funding level (assets divided by liabilities).

In some jurisdictions, "solvency ratio" is used for a termination or wind-up valuation basis. In Canada's federal pension regulations, solvency liabilities are defined on the basis that the plan is terminated, and the solvency ratio is defined in relation to the plan's solvency assets and solvency liabilities. Consumer guidance in Ontario similarly describes solvency as the funding needed to pay benefits if a plan were wound up at the valuation date, and contrasts it with a going concern basis that assumes the plan continues.

Terminology may differ even within a country. For example, Ontario pension regulations define a "wind up funded ratio" as the ratio of Ontario assets to Ontario wind up liability.

Regulators may use solvency ratios for monitoring and disclosure. Canada's federal pensions supervisor (OSFI) publishes Estimated Solvency Ratio exercises for federally regulated pension plans with defined benefit provisions to help identify potential solvency issues before plans file actuarial reports.

In the United Kingdom, defined benefit schemes use multiple valuation bases and use the term "solvency measure" for a comparison of assets with an estimate of the cost of securing members' accrued benefits with annuities from an insurance company, often referred to as a buyout basis.

== Interpretation and limitations ==
Solvency ratios are typically interpreted in context rather than against a universal benchmark. Analysts often compare an organisation's ratios over time and against peers, because business models, industry risk and financing structures can differ substantially.

Comparability can be affected by the accounting basis and measurement choices. Corporate solvency ratios are derived from financial statements and can vary with differences in accounting standards and the treatment of leases, pensions and other long-term obligations. In regulated sectors, solvency ratios are defined by supervisory frameworks and may change with updates to rules on valuation, eligible capital and risk measurement, which can limit comparability across jurisdictions or between regimes.

For this reason, sources often treat solvency ratios as indicators that can help identify leverage, funding or capital adequacy issues, but they do not by themselves determine whether an organisation will remain solvent.

== See also ==
- Capital adequacy ratio
- Current ratio
- Debt service coverage ratio
- Financial ratio
- Times interest earned
