= Financial ratio =

Numerical value to determine the financial condition of a company

A financial ratio or accounting ratio states the relative magnitude of two selected numerical values taken from an enterprise's financial statements. Often used in accounting, there are many standard ratios used to try to evaluate the overall financial condition of a corporation or other organization. Financial ratios may be used by managers within a firm, by current and potential shareholders (owners) of a firm, and by a firm's creditors. Financial analysts use financial ratios to compare the strengths and weaknesses in various companies. If shares in a company are publicly listed, the market price of the shares is used in certain financial ratios.

Ratios can be expressed as a decimal value, such as 0.10, or given as an equivalent percentage value, such as 10%. Some ratios are usually quoted as percentages, especially ratios that are usually or always less than 1, such as earnings yield, while others are usually quoted as decimal numbers, especially ratios that are usually more than 1, such as P/E ratio; these latter are also called multiples. Given any ratio, one can take its reciprocal; if the ratio was above 1, the reciprocal will be below 1, and conversely. The reciprocal expresses the same information, but may be more understandable: for instance, the earnings yield can be compared with bond yields, while the P/E ratio cannot be: for example, a P/E ratio of 20 corresponds to an earnings yield of 5%.

== Sources of data ==
Values used in calculating financial ratios are taken from the balance sheet, income statement, statement of cash flows or (sometimes) the statement of changes in equity. These comprise the firm's "accounting statements" or financial statements. The statements' data is based on the accounting method and accounting standards used by the organisation.

== Purpose and types ==
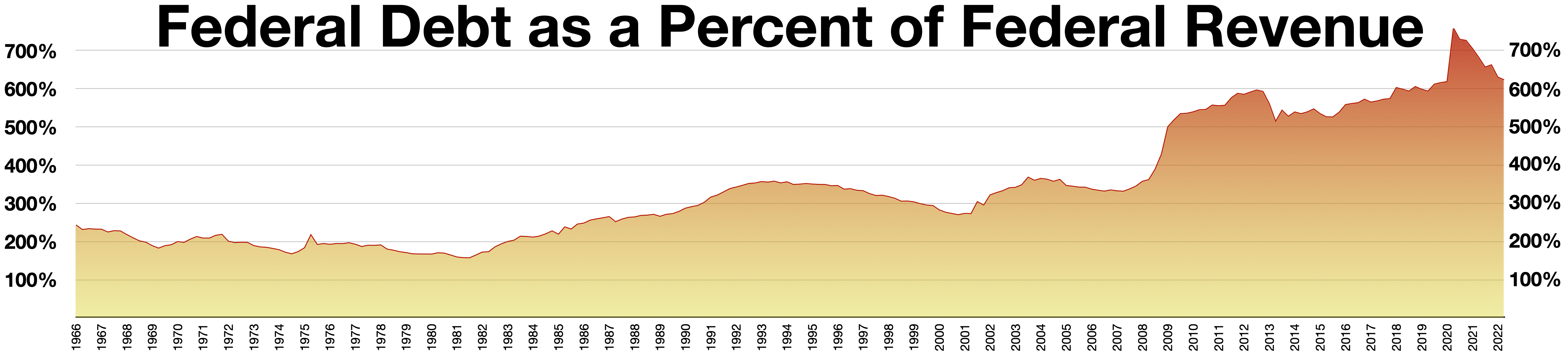
Federal debt to Federal revenue ratio

- Financial ratios quantify many aspects of a business and are an integral part of the financial statement analysis. Financial ratios are categorized according to the financial aspect of the business which the ratio measures.
- Profitability ratios measure the firm's use of its assets and control of its expenses to generate an acceptable rate of return.
- Liquidity ratios measure the availability of cash to pay debt.
- Efficiency (activity) ratios measure how quickly a firm converts non-cash assets to cash assets.
- Debt ratios measure the firm's ability to repay long-term debt.
- Market ratios measure investor response to owning a company's stock and also the cost of issuing stock.

These are concerned with the return on investment for shareholders, and with the relationship between return and the value of an investment in company's shares.

Financial ratios allow for comparisons

- between companies
- between industries
- between different time periods for one company
- between a single company and its industry average

Ratios generally are not useful unless they are benchmarked against something else, like past performance or another company. Thus, the ratios of firms in different industries, which face different risks, capital requirements, and competition are usually hard to compare.

== Accounting methods and principles ==
Financial ratios may not be directly comparable between companies that use different accounting methods or follow various standard accounting practices. Most public companies are required by law to use generally accepted accounting principles for their home countries, but private companies, partnerships and sole proprietorships may elect to not use accrual basis accounting. Large multi-national corporations may use International Financial Reporting Standards to produce their financial statements, or they may use the generally accepted accounting principles of their home country.

There is no international standard for calculating the summary data presented in all financial statements, and the terminology is not always consistent between companies, industries, countries and time periods.

== Types of Ratio Comparisons ==
An important feature of ratio analysis is interpreting ratio values. A meaningful basis for comparison is needed to answer questions such as "Is it too high or too low?" or "Is it good or bad?". Two types of ratio comparisons can be made, cross-sectional and time-series.

=== Cross-Sectional Analysis ===
Cross-sectional analysis compares the financial ratios of different companies at the same point in time. It allows companies to benchmark from other competitors by comparing their ratio values to similar companies in the industry.

=== Time-Series Analysis ===
Time-series analysis evaluates a company's performance over time. It compares its current performance against past or historical performance. This can help assess the company's progress by looking into developing trends or year-to-year changes.

== Abbreviations and terminology ==
Various abbreviations may be used in financial statements, especially financial statements summarized on the Internet. Sales reported by a firm are usually net sales, which deduct returns, allowances, and early payment discounts from the charge on an invoice. Net income is always the amount after taxes, depreciation, amortization, and interest, unless otherwise stated. Otherwise, the amount would be EBIT, or EBITDA (see below).

Companies that are primarily involved in providing services with labour do not generally report "Sales" based on hours. These companies tend to report "revenue" based on the monetary value of income that the services provide.

Note that Shareholders' Equity and Owner's Equity are not the same thing, Shareholder's Equity represents the total number of shares in the company multiplied by each share's book value; Owner's Equity represents the total number of shares that an individual shareholder owns (usually the owner with controlling interest), multiplied by each share's book value. It is important to make this distinction when calculating ratios.

=== Abbreviations ===
(Note: These are not ratios, but values in currency.)

- COGS = Cost of goods sold, or cost of sales.
- EBIT = Earnings before interest and taxes
- EBITDA = Earnings before interest, taxes, depreciation, and amortization
- EPS = Earnings per share

== Ratios ==
=== Profitability ratios ===
Profitability ratios measure the company's use of its assets and control of its expenses to generate an acceptable rate of return.

Profitability ratios
Name	Ratio	Notes
Gross margin, Gross profit margin or Gross Profit Rate	(Gross Profit)/(Net Sales) or (Net Sales − COGS)/(Net Sales)	
Operating margin, Operating Income Margin, Operating profit margin or Return on sales (ROS)	(Operating Income)/(Net Sales)	Operating income is the difference between operating revenues and operating expenses, but it is also sometimes used as a synonym for EBIT and operating profit. This is true if the firm has no non-operating income. (Earnings before interest and taxes / Sales)
Profit margin, net margin or net profit margin	(Net Profit)/(Net Sales)	
Return on equity (ROE)	(Net Income)/(Average Shareholders Equity)	
Return on assets (ROA ratio or Du Pont Ratio)	(Net Income)/(Average Total Assets)	
Return on assets (ROA)	(Net Income)/(Total Assets)	
Return on assets Du Pont (ROA Du Pont)	(Net Income)/(Net Sales) · (Net Sales)/(Total Assets)	
Return on Equity Du Pont (ROE Du Pont)	(Net Income)/(Net Sales) · (Net Sales)/(Average Assets) · (Average Assets)/(Average Equity)	
Return on net assets (RONA)	(Net Income)/(Fixed Assets + Working Capital)	
Return on capital (ROC)	(EBIT(1 − (Tax Rate)))/(Invested Capital)	
Risk adjusted return on capital (RAROC)	(Expected Return)/(Economic Capital)	(Expected Return)/(Value at Risk)
Return on capital employed (ROCE)	EBIT/(Capital Employed)	This is similar to (ROI), which calculates Net Income per Owner's Equity
Cash-flow return on investment (CFROI)	(Cash Flow)/(Market Recapitalisation)	
Efficiency ratio	(Non-Interest expense)/Revenue	
Basic Earnings Power (BEP)	EBIT/(Total Assets)	Similar to return on assets (ROA), but uses EBIT instead of net income

=== Liquidity ratios ===
Liquidity ratios measure the availability of cash to pay debt.

Liquidity ratios
Name	Ratio	Notes
Current ratio (Working Capital Ratio)	(Current Assets)/(Current Liabilities)	
Acid-test ratio (Quick ratio)	(Current Assets − (Inventories + Prepayments))/(Current Liabilities)	
Cash ratio	(Cash and Marketable Securities)/(Current Liabilities)	
Operating cash flow ratio	(Operating Cash Flow)/(Total Debts)	
Net working capital to sales ratio	(Current Assets - Current Liabilities)/Sales	This ratio assesses a business's actual liquidity position against its need for liquidity, represented by its sales.
Working Capital Turnover Ratio	(Net Sales)/(Average Working Capital)	Similar to the Net working capital to sales ratio

=== Efficiency ratios ===
Efficiency ratios measure the effectiveness of the firm's use of resources.

Efficiency ratios
Name	Ratio	Notes
Average collection period	(Accounts Receivable)/(Annual Credit Sales) × 365 Days	
Degree of Operating Leverage (DOL)	(Percent Change in Net Operating Income)/(Percent Change in Sales)	
DSO Ratio.	(Accounts Receivable)/(Total Annual Sales) × 365 Days	
Average payment period	(Accounts Payable)/(Annual Credit Purchases) × 365 Days	
Asset turnover	(Net Sales)/(Total Assets)	
Stock turnover ratio	(Cost of Goods Sold)/(Average Inventory)	
Receivables turnover ratio	(Net Credit Sales)/(Average Net Receivables)	
Inventory conversion ratio	(365 Days)/(Inventory Turnover)	
Inventory conversion period	Inventory/(Cost of Goods Sold) × 365 Days	Essentially same thing as above
Receivables conversion period	Receivables/(Net Sales) × 365 Days	
Payables conversion period	(Accounts Payables)/Purchases × 365 Days	
Cash Conversion Cycle	(Inventory Conversion Period) + (Receivables Conversion Period) - (Payables Conversion Period)	

=== Debt ratios ===
Debt ratios quantify the firm's ability to repay long-term debt. Debt ratios measure the level of borrowed funds used by the firm to finance its activities.

Debt ratios
Name	Ratio	Notes
Debt ratio	(Total Debts or Liabilities)/(Total Assets)	
Long-term debt to assets ratio	(Long-term debt)/(Total assets)	
Debt-to-equity ratio (gearing ratio)	((Long-term Debt) + (Value of Leases))/((Average Shareholders' Equity))	
Long-term Debt to equity (LT Debt to Equity)	(Long-term Debt)/(Average Shareholders' Equity)	
Times interest earned ratio (Interest Coverage Ratio)	EBIT/(Annual Interest Expense), or equivalently (Net Income)/(Annual Interest Expense)	
Debt service coverage ratio	(Net Operating Income)/(Total Debt Service)	
Cash-flow-to-debt ratio	(Cash Flow from Operations)/(Total Debt)	

=== Market ratios ===
Market ratios measure investor response to owning a company's stock and also the cost of issuing stock. These are concerned with the return on investment for shareholders, and with the relationship between return and the value of an investment in company's shares.

Debt ratios
Name	Ratio	Notes
Earnings per share (EPS)	(Net Earnings)/(Number of Shares)	
Payout ratio	Dividends/Earnings	Dividends/EPS
Dividend cover (the inverse of Payout Ratio)	(Earnings per Share)/(Dividend per Share)	
P/E ratio	(Market Price per Share)/(Diluted EPS)	
Dividend yield	Dividend/(Current Market Price)	
Cash flow ratio or Price/cash flow ratio	(Market Price per Share)/(Present Value of Cash Flow per Share)	
Price to book value ratio (P/B or PBV)	(Market Price per Share)/(Balance Sheet Price per Share)	
Price/sales ratio	(Market Price per Share)/(Gross Sales)	
PEG ratio	(Price per Earnings)/(Annual EPS Growth)	

=== Other ratios ===
Other ratios
Name	Ratio	Notes
EV/EBITDA	(Enterprise Value)/EBITDA	
EV/Sales	(Enterprise Value)/(Net Sales)	
Cost/Income ratio		
EV/capacity		
EV/output		

=== Capital budgeting ratios ===
In addition to assisting management and owners in diagnosing the financial health of their company, ratios can also help managers make decisions about investments or projects that the company is considering to take, such as acquisitions, or expansion.

Many formal methods are used in capital budgeting, including the techniques such as

- Net present value
- Profitability index
- Internal rate of return
- Modified internal rate of return
- Equivalent annuity

== See also ==
- List of financial performance measures
