= Coverage ratio =

Coverage ratio may refer to

- Building coverage ratio, related to floor area ratio
- Debt service coverage ratio
- Interest coverage ratio
