= ROCE =

ROCE or RoCE may refer to:

- Return on capital employed, an accounting ratio used in finance
- Return on common equity, a measure of the profitability of a business in relation to the equity
- RDMA over Converged Ethernet, a computer network protocol
