= Basic Earnings Power =

Financial metric measuring operating profitability relative to assets

The Basic Earnings Power (BEP), also known as the BEP ratio, is a financial ratio that measures a company's ability to generate profit from its assets before accounting for interest and taxes. It is calculated by dividing earnings before interest and taxes (EBIT) by total assets. Distinct from the broader concept of earnings power—a firm’s overall capacity to produce profits—BEP focuses on operational efficiency, isolating earnings from core activities independent of financing or tax effects.

Compared to return on assets (ROA), which uses net income after interest and taxes, BEP highlights operating performance, enabling comparisons across firms with different debt levels or tax situations. Analysts derive BEP from financial statements, such as the income statement and balance sheet, often using data reported in earnings reports.

== Calculation ==
The Basic Earnings Power (BEP) ratio is calculated as:

$$\text{BEP} = \frac{\text{Earnings Before Interest and Taxes (EBIT)}}{\text{Total Assets}}$$

Where:

- Earnings Before Interest and Taxes (EBIT) is the operating income from core business activities, including non-operating income (e.g., dividends), but excluding interest and tax expenses.
- Total Assets is the sum of all resources owned by the company, as reported on the balance sheet.

For example, if a company has an EBIT of $10 million and total assets of $50 million, its BEP is 0.2, indicating it earns 20 cents of operating profit per dollar of assets.

== Interpretation ==
A higher BEP reflects greater efficiency in generating operating profits from assets, with values varying by industry—capital-intensive sectors (e.g., manufacturing) may range from 0.05–0.1, while service firms might exceed 0.2. Unlike ROA, which includes financing costs in net income, BEP focuses solely on operational earnings, making it less sensitive to leverage but blind to debt burdens. It differs from the price-to-earnings ratio, a market valuation metric, and should be used alongside other ratios for a full financial picture.

== See also ==
- Return on assets
- Financial ratio
- Earnings before interest and taxes
