= Industry average =

Business tool

Industry averages (of financial ratios) are generally using as benchmarks or tools which helps business to make comparisons that helps to determine its position within the industry and evaluate financial performance of the business. It is a useful tool for business managers and investors, helps with decision-making process. It represent data figures of various business organizations across different industries of producing distinct products and services. Some individuals and organizations use industry averages as a useful tools, it gives a medium level of all other competitors performance. Compare their own data figure with those averages, it could help individual or organization to make decisions and predictions about possible outcomes. Such as, Investors compare an organization's financial ratios with industry averages to evaluate whether the organization have potential power to growth in the future, and level of risk for the investment. All those factors contribute to decision making and deeper analysis. Data required can be collect through survey or through several professional statistic websites, for individuals are more likely to obtain information using internet. Industry averages could also refer to terms related to industrial sector such as industry averages salaries, unemployment rates, Clickthrough rates and so on, using as benchmarks for comparisons.

== Definition and usage ==
Industry can be define as a type of business and activities involved in process of producing products for sale. The classification of industry usually follows the International Standard Industrial Classification (ISIC), or certain standard according to different countries or states. Averages represents a standard or level which can be considered to be typical or usual. To combine those two gives a term called industry averages. Industry averages ratios are summarized measure of company's financial performance, in form of collection of data, usually financial ratio from a various type of business that offers different products and services. Publishers collect data from financial statements of a great range of firms to obtain industry averages. The results will be break out into different categories based on the size of the assets of the organization. Data generated are then used as a benchmarking tool in comparing financial performance of a company within the industry. A primary reason for benchmarking the business against its industry averages due to obvious variations of financial ratios across different industries.

Other than Financial ratios, industry averages also related to most of the terms in industrial sector. Industry averages salaries stand for general level of wages for individuals classified by different industries. It is a tool for comparisons purposes, individuals understand their position within the industry through the averages thus can negotiate with their leaders for wage increase. For job seekers it helps them decide their favorable range of salaries thus can discuss during the job interview. For business which wants to hire someone, it provides information for the interviewers use for determine whether to hire the jobseekers.

Industry averages unemployment rate can be calculated using [ (Number of Unemployed) divided by (Labour Force) times one hundred percent ]it represents the percentage of individuals actively seeking for job but currently unemployed, classified according to industry. This data set commonly used by economists to analysis economic conditions, as unemployment is considered as a critical problem which slows-down the economic growth, causing a series of social problems like inequality and poverty.

Clickthrough rate (CTR) represents the ratio on a number of users view a webpage or other content from a hyperlink. It's commonly used for measuring the successful of an online advertising or email promotions. It's widely used in the e-commerce sector, industry averages of Clickthrough rate assist the analysts to evaluate the performance of certain way of online promoting.

It is likely to be confused with difference between industry averages and financial ratios. Financial ratio is a relative figures of two numbers taken from business financial statements, often used in accounting for financial statement analysis purposes. When evaluating the financial & historical performance of a business, financial ratio is used against industry averages. Financial Ratio analysis make comparisons among items within the financial statement, shows their relationship between one another.( A ratio is a relationship between two numbers, often expressed as ‘x to y’ or ‘x : y’.) it was widely used by academics, financial analytics, investor and small business managers. Usually used to recognize possible business failure and forecasting unstable factors. Generally, there are two type of ratios comparisons, trend analysis & industry comparisons.

=== Trend analysis ===
It is a technical analysis based on historical data to estimate the trend of the data thus forecasting for its futures. Comparing financial ratios over periods of time to determine financial performance of the business. Comparing current with past figures to examine the trending, whether it's getting better or deteriorating over time. The main purpose is to maximizing firms potential profit and achieve better performance within the industry, compare to its competitors.

=== Industry comparisons ===
A tool which facilitates understanding of an organization towards its position compare to other companies within the same industrial sector to evaluate threats and opportunities for business owners. The process is to compare the performance of business to other business within the same industrial sector, it's important to compare within the industry because it gives a general standard to determine Company's position within the industry. Whereas the main competitors for a business are those within the same sector, offers the same type of products or services.

== Source of data ==
There are various of ratios can be used for analysis depending on the objective of the analysis and nature relationship between figures. For more detailed information related to the ratios below please see Financial Ratios. Mainly there are five general classes of ratios used for financial analysis

=== Industry Averages Financial Ratio ===
==== Liquidity Ratios ====
Ability of a company to meet its short term obligations measures the speed that company can turn its Assets into cash to meet short term debt. The higher the Liquidity ratio, the better flexibility of the business.

==== Activity Ratios ====
It shows the amount that company has invested in certain type of assets, in compare to the revenue it has produced for the business. Measures the speed of a certain account can turn into sales/cash.

==== Leverage Ratios ====
Examines Company's solvency which means its ability to meet long term obligations by the time of its deadline.

==== Profitability Ratios ====
Financial metrics used by investors and analysts to evaluate the organization's ability in generating profit. Measures the ability of a company in generating income relative to its Assets, OE and Sales.

==== Market Value Ratios ====
The group of ratios mainly focusing on the relationship between firm's stock price towards its earning per share.

Financial ratio examples
| Liquidity Ratios | Quick ratio(QR) Current ratio(CR) |
| Activity Ratios | Asset Turnover (ATO) Accounts Receivables Turnovers (ART) |
| Leverage Ratios | Long-term Debt Ratio (LTDR) Short-term Debt Ratio (STDR) Total Debt Ratio (TDR) |
| Profitability Ratios | Return on Net Worth (RONW) Return on Assets (ROA) Return on Sales (ROS) |
| Market Value Ratios | Earnings per Share (EPS), Dividend ratio, Price/Earnings (P/E) ratio |

All the ratios listed above can be written as industry averages (something) such as industry averages profitability ratio, represents for the average figures of profitability ratio for a certain industry. Through compare those ratios of a business with the industry averages could obtain its position within the industry. Data can be obtained through website or through a survey or census. However, for individual users they usually obtain data from internet because survey requires a huge amount of work which can be hard to achieve for individual. There are some free basic data information of some industry, but for more detailed analysis report, individuals or organizations needs to purchase for it due to the convenience to obtain information through websites.

=== Tools for Larger Industries & Companies ===
- Mergent Online

Contains global company information and data, wide range of financial statement, economic news of U.S. information collect with daily updates.

- D&B Hoover's

A good source of company profiles, analytic reports and financial information, news etc.

- Factiva

Contains a great range of articles related to company, topic, and industry, and offers full text access.

=== Tools for Smaller Industries & Companies ===
- Bizminer

Resource to access industry financial ratios and other research statistics, competitive market analysis etc.

- Key Business Ratios

Provides access to industry benchmarking data, financial ratios for both public and private organizations. Along with industry balance sheet and income statement, organized financial ratios.

== Limitations and potential problem ==
The potential problem of using industry averages as a benchmark occurs when selecting the proper type of information from a variation of data. When business compare its performance with industry averages, it only compare itself with the middle range. Business with more potential power should not be satisfied by achieving the industry averages cause it's only better than 50% of the whole industry. Instead, they should benchmarking themself with the leaders of the industry to set higher targets for the company and aim for more growth with better performance. For those firms with their figure below the industry averages, might have several weak spots within it, managers should start acting to change the situation, cause its not even better than half of the industry. However, attitude towards industry averages vary due to different situations and status of the business, it affected by some factors, such as size of the business. Thus managers and decision makers should consider more than just statistic. Study suggests that there are dramatic differences between small private and large public business's industry average ratios. Those differences appeared for every leverage ratios and mostly for activity, profitability ratios. For liquidity ratios there are no signs of difference, also some profitability ratios with various of expense ratios. Users needs to determine an appropriate industry average ratio when used for comparisons with their own data.

Another potential problem for industry averages is the accuracy of the data used by individuals and organizations. The source of data information obtained by users can be complicated and hard to trace. Averages were calculated from large sets of database, thus there is possible error occurs, due to various factors such as human error ( incorrect inputs, error within the calculation process ) which sometimes can be unavoidable. However, for those well known websites and organizations, they will try to reduce the chance of errors by setting people responsible towards checking the data's accuracy and updates data presented to the users. Individuals and organizations can use data from websites of larger companies generally because it's more reliable, to reduce the chance of this kind of problem to occurs when using industry averages.
