= Return on investment =

Ratio between net income and investment

Return on investment (ROI) or return on costs (ROC) is the ratio between net income or profit to investment (costs resulting from an investment of some resources). A high ROI means the investment's gains compare favorably to its cost. As a performance measure, ROI is used to evaluate the efficiency of an investment or to compare the efficiencies of several different investments. In economic terms, it is one way of relating profits to capital invested.

== Purpose ==
In business, the purpose of the return on investment (ROI) metric is to measure, per period, rates of return on money invested in an economic entity to decide whether or not to undertake an investment. It is also used as an indicator to compare different investments within a portfolio. The investment with the largest ROI is usually prioritized, even though the spread of ROI over the time period of an investment should also be taken into account. Recently, the concept has also been applied to scientific funding agencies’ (e.g., National Science Foundation) investments in research of open source hardware and subsequent returns for direct digital replication.

ROI and related metrics provide a snapshot of profitability, adjusted for the size of the investment assets tied up in the enterprise. ROI is often compared to expected (or required) rates of return on money invested. ROI is not time-adjusted (unlike e.g. net present value): most textbooks describe it with a "Year 0" investment and two to three years' income.

Marketing decisions have an obvious potential connection to the numerator of ROI (profits), but these same decisions often influence assets’ usage and capital requirements (for example, receivables and inventories). Marketers should understand the position of their company and the returns expected. For a marketing ROI percentage to be credible, the effects of the marketing program must be isolated from other influences when reported to executives. In a survey of nearly 200 senior marketing managers, 77 percent responded that they found the "return on investment" metric very useful.

Return on investment may be extended to terms other than financial gain. For example, social return on investment (SROI) is a principles-based method for measuring extra-financial value (i.e., environmental and social value not currently reflected in conventional financial accounts) relative to resources invested. It can be used by any entity to evaluate the impact on stakeholders, identify ways to improve performance and enhance the performance of investments.

=== Limitations with ROI usage ===
As a decision tool, it is simple to understand. The simplicity of the formula allows users to freely choose variables, e.g., length of the calculation time, whether overhead cost is included, or which factors are used to calculate income or cost components. The use of ROI as an indicator for prioritizing investment projects alone can be misleading since usually the ROI figure is not accompanied by an explanation of its make-up. ROI should be accompanied by the underlying data that forms the inputs, this is often in the format of a business case. For long-term investments, the need for a Net Present Value adjustment is great and without it the ROI is incorrect. Similar to discounted cash flow, a Discounted ROI should be used instead. One limitation associated with the traditional ROI calculation is that it does not fully "capture the short-term or long-term importance, value, or risks associated with natural and social capital", because it does not account for the environmental, social, and governance performance of an organization. Without a metric for measuring the short- and long-term environmental, social and governance performance of a firm, decision makers are planning for the future without considering the extent of the impacts associated with their decisions. One or more separate measures, aligned with relevant compliance functions, are frequently provided for this purpose.

== Calculation ==
Return on investment (ROI) can be calculated in different ways, depending on the goal and application. The most comprehensive formula for ROI is:

$ROI (%) = \frac{I_0 + I - Q}{Q} \times 100%$

where $I_0$ is the current value of investment, $I$ is income from investment, and $Q$ is the initial investment and other expenses.

For example, you invested $10,000 in stocks (initial investment) and paid $200 in brokerage fees (other expenses). After one year, the current value of your investment is $12,500, not yet sold. During the year, you received $300 in dividends (income from the investment). So, the ROI is the following:

$ROI (%) = \frac{12500 + 300 - 10200}{10200} \times 100% = 25%$

As the duration of this investment is 1 year, this ROI is annual.

For a single-period review, divide the return (net profit) by the resources that were committed (investment):

return on investment = Net income / Investment
where:
Net income = gross profit − expenses.
investment = stock + market outstanding + claims.

or

return on investment = (gain from investment − cost of investment) / cost of investment

or

return on investment = (revenue − cost of goods sold) / cost of goods sold

or

return on investment = (net program benefits / program costs) × 100

=== Property ===
Complications in calculating ROI can arise when real property is refinanced, or a second mortgage is taken out. Interest on a second, or refinanced, loan may increase, and loan fees may be charged, both of which can reduce the ROI, when the new numbers are used in the ROI equation. There may also be an increase in maintenance costs and property taxes, and an increase in utility rates if the owner of a residential rental or commercial property pays these expenses.

Complex calculations may also be required for a property purchased with an adjustable-rate mortgage (ARM), which has a variable interest rate that increases annually over the duration of the loan.

=== Marketing investment ===
Marketing not only influences net profits but also can affect investment levels too. New plants and equipment, inventories, and accounts receivable are three of the main categories of investments that can be affected by marketing decisions.

Return on assets (RoA), return on net assets (RoNA), return on capital (RoC), and return on invested capital (RoIC), in particular, are similar measures with variations on how "investment" is defined.

ROI is a popular metric for heads of marketing because of marketing budget allocation. Return on Investment helps identify marketing mix activities that should continue to be funded and which should be cut.

== Return on integration (ROInt) ==
To address the lack of integration of the short and long term importance, value and risks associated with natural and social capital into the traditional ROI calculation, companies are valuing their environmental, social and governance (ESG) performance through an integrated management approach to reporting that expands ROI to Return on Integration. This allows companies to value their investments not just for their financial return but also the long term environmental and social return of their investments. By highlighting environmental, social and governance performance in reporting, decision makers have the opportunity to identify new areas for value creation that are not revealed through traditional financial reporting. The social cost of carbon is one value that can be incorporated into Return on Integration calculations to encompass the damage to society from greenhouse gas emissions that result from an investment. This is an integrated approach to reporting that supports Integrated Bottom Line (IBL) decision making, which takes triple bottom line (TBL) a step further and combines financial, environmental and social performance reporting into one balance sheet. This approach provides decision makers with the insight to identify opportunities for value creation that promote growth and change within an organization.

== See also ==
- Bang for the buck
- Energy return on energy invested
- Internal rate of return
- Marketing plan
- Price–earnings ratio
- Rate of profit
- Rate of return (RoR), also known as 'rate of profit' or sometimes just 'return', is the ratio of money gained or lost (whether realized or unrealized) on an investment relative to the amount of money invested
- Return on assets (RoA)
- Return on brand (ROB)
- Return on capital employed (ROCE)
- Return on capital (RoC)
- Return on equity (ROE)
- Return on invested capital (RoIC)
- Return on Investment + cost of Living (ROIL) (Frequently used for small businesses.)
- Return on marketing investment (ROMI) is "the contribution attributable to marketing (net of marketing spending), divided by the marketing 'invested' or risked
- Return on modeling effort (ROME)
- Return on net assets (RoNA)
- Return on relationship investment (RORI)
- Return on time invested (ROTI)
- ROI for information technology is used to evaluate applications portfolios and information systems
- Time to value
