= Farm equity =

Net worth of a farm

Farm equity refers to the net worth of the farm sector's assets (i.e., farmland, machinery, equipment, facilities, crop and livestock inventories) against which there is no debt. This represents all farm proprietors’ residual claims to farm assets. Increases in farm equity in the late 1970s became increasingly important for most agricultural producers as a source of additional collateral against which to obtain credit for operating and expansion purposes. The level of farm equity ranges widely from one farm to another. The overall debt-asset ratio is a measure of the farm sector's financial condition or solvency.
