= Cash value added =

Business profitability measurement

Cash value added (CVA) is a measure of business profitability defined as the EBITDA generated by the business, less tax, less its required return.

The required return is an annuity based on the purchase price of the assets in use in the business, inflated to today's value of money, the weighted average cost of capital (WACC) and the economic life of the assets. CVA can also be expressed as an index, where the CVA is divided by the required return. An index of more than 1.0 will indicate profitability while an index below 1.0 will indicate value destruction.

== See also ==
- Economic value added (EVA)
- Return on capital employed (ROCE)
- Return on equity (ROE)
