= Negative return =

Negative return may refer to:

- Negative return (finance) a loss on a financial investment
- Negative return, the point in the ascent at which an RTLS was no longer possible in Space Shuttle abort modes
