= Enterprise value-to-sales ratio =

Enterprise value/sales is a financial ratio that compares the total value (as measured by enterprise value) of the company to its sales. The ratio is, strictly speaking, denominated in years; it demonstrates how many dollars of EV are generated by one dollar of yearly sales. Generally, the lower the ratio, the cheaper the company is. Some investment professionals believe—as enterprise value and sales both consider debt and equity holders—EV/Sales is superior to the oft quoted price/sales ratio.

== Use in valuation ==
The enterprise value-to-sales ratio is commonly used in relative valuation, particularly for companies that have little or no current earnings. Aswath Damodaran classifies enterprise value-to-sales as a revenue multiple that relates the value of the business to the revenues generated by the firm.

Because enterprise value includes both debt and equity claims, EV/sales may be more suitable than the price-to-sales ratio when comparing firms with different capital structures. Damodaran notes that price-to-sales can produce misleading comparisons across firms in the same sector when they have different degrees of leverage, whereas value-to-sales is internally consistent because it compares firm value with firm revenues.
