= Earnings guidance =

Publicly traded corporation's official prediction

In financial reporting, earnings guidance or simply guidance is a publicly traded corporation's official prediction of its own near-future profit or loss, stated as an amount of money per share. Earnings guidance is usually a financial forecast presented as a quarterly report of the corporation's performance in the next quarter. Guidance is an aid to financial analysts and the stakeholders in valuing the corporation, and helps prevent overvaluation.

Guidance refers to Information that a company provides as an indication or estimate of its future earnings. Guidance reports estimating a company's future earnings have some influence over analyst stock ratings and investor decisions to buy, hold, or sell the security.

In the United States, a quarterly revenue forecast, or quarterly guidance, by publicly traded companies had become by the 2000s both a common practice (75% of American firms in 2003) and a major influence on the firm's share price. By the 2010s, the quarterly guidance practice had fallen out of favor among many companies (27% of firms continued the practice in 2017) as it was seen as emphasizing a focus on short-term performance. By contrast, public Eurozone companies rarely (1%) issued quarterly guidance in the 2010s.

== See also ==
- Earnings report
- Earnings call
- Quarterly financial report
- Financial statement
- Income statement
