= Hydrofarm =

Agriculture equipment company

Hydrofarm Inc.
- Type: Public
- Traded as: Nasdaq: HYFM
- ISIN: US44888K2096
- Industry: Agriculture, Hydroponics
- Founded: 1977; 49 years ago
- Founder: Stuart Dvorin
- Headquarters: Petaluma, CA
- Number of locations: 9
- Areas served: Fairfield, CA; Gresham, OR, Fontana, CA; Denver, CO; New Hudson, MI; Shoemakersville, PA; Surrey, BC, Canada; Cambridge, ON, Canada; Zarazoga, Spain
- Key people: Bill Toler (CEO); B. John Lindemann (CFO); Terry Fitch (president); Peter Wardenburg (EVP)
- Products: nutrients & additives, lighting, atmospheric control, hydroponics, growing media, plant care/pest & disease control, seed starting/cloning, garden accessories, food storage
- Brands: Active Air, Active Aqua, Innovative Growers Equipment, Jump Start, Phantom, PHOTOBIO, SunBlaster, Autopilot, Gaia Green, Grotek, GROW!T, HEAVY16, House & Garden, Mad Farmer, Roots Organics
- Website: hydrofarm.com

Hydrofarm Inc. (HYFM) is an American company specializing in the distribution and manufacture of controlled environment agriculture equipment and supplies.

Founded in 1977, Hydrofarm went public on December 14, 2020. The company operates a total of nine distribution centers: six located within the United States, two in Canada, and one in Spain. Additionally, Hydrofarm maintains offices in China.

The company is listed on the NASDAQ as HYFM.

== History ==
=== 1977-2000 ===
Founded in 1977 by Stuart Dvorin as Applied Hydroponics, Hydrofarm originated in Marin County during the drought of the late 1970s. Dvorin introduced water-saving hydroponics, which gained popularity among gardeners. The product range expanded to include energy-efficient grow lights and germination kits, leading Hydrofarm to venture into gardening and the distribution of gardening equipment for both professional growers and hobbyists.

Throughout the 1980s, Hydrofarm extended its product line and distribution network, but in the 1990s, the company concentrated on developing technologies to meet the growing demand for indoor gardening supplies. In 1994, the company relocated its headquarters to Petaluma in Sonoma County, employing 65 individuals at that time.

=== 2000s – 2010s ===
The Petaluma facility, initially spanning 150,000 square feet with over 150 employees, further expanded to 195,000 square feet in 2017.

Hydrofarm expanded to Canada in 2017 through the acquisition of Eddi's Wholesale and Greenstar Plant Products.

=== 2020s – Present ===
On December 10, 2020, Hydrofarm raised $173 million on the eve of its initial public offering. The IPO occurred shortly after five US states voted to legalize cannabis, and the House of Representatives passed legislation to legalize marijuana at the federal level. The company is listed on the NASDAQ as HYFM.

Then in 2021, Hydrofarm acquired three more companies, including Field 16, a Los Angeles-based maker of plant nutrients used in the cannabis industry, and the House & Garden portfolio of brands from Humboldt County.

As of the end of the third quarter in 2023, six hedge funds held stakes in the group, compared to five in the previous quarter.

Facing more competition in the cannabis markets and less optimism among the financial institutions in 2022, the company underwent restructuring, including portfolio and brand adjustments, relocation, consolidation of manufacturing and distribution centers, and the impending closure of two company locations.

In the report released on February 29, 2024, for the fiscal year 2023, Hydrofarm reported a notable improvement in its financial performance, despite a decrease in net sales to $226.6 million from $344.5 million in 2022.

The company saw a significant increase in its gross profit, reaching $37.6 million, up from $29.3 million in the previous year, with the gross profit margin rising to 16.6% of net sales, compared to 8.5% in 2022. Adjusted gross profit also saw an increase to $55 million from $48.2 million, and the adjusted gross profit margin improved to 24.3% of net sales from 14% in the prior year. Furthermore, Hydrofarm's net loss reduced to $64.8 million from a net loss of $285.4 million in the previous year. The company achieved a positive Adjusted EBITDA of $0.3 million, a significant turnaround from a negative $21.2 million in the prior year and reported positive cash flow from operating activities at $7 million, with a free cash flow of $2.8 million.

== Products ==
Hydrofarm's wholesale catalog comprises over 6000 items, featuring hydroponic equipment and supplies, including sediment filters, indoor grow lights, flood tables and benches, pots, hydroponic growing systems, growing containers, soil, and gardening accessories. The company's primary sales come from lighting products, and aside from manufacturing, Hydrofarm also distributes for other agricultural businesses, particularly those producing plant nutrients.

== Management ==
Bill Toler assumed the role of chief executive officer in 2019, replacing longtime CEO Peter Wardenburg. Prior to joining Hydrofarm, Toler served as president and CEO of Hostess Brands. B. John Lindeman joined as chief financial officer in March 2020, while former CEO Peter Wardenburg oversees product development.

== Portfolio ==
Hydrofarm raised $173 million the day before its initial public offering on December 10, 2020, going public amid the increasing momentum to legalize cannabis in the US. The company's key markets include growers of cannabis, fruits, flowers, vegetables, herbs, grains, and other plants. Despite investor sentiment cooling in the latter half of 2023 due to negative returns in revenue and earnings per share, Hydrofarm's portfolio includes 26 internally developed, proprietary brands with about 900 product variations under 24 patents and 60 registered trademarks. The company also markets over 40 preferred brands totaling another 900 stock-keeping units (SKUs).

In 2021 Hydrofarm launched Phantom PHOTOBIO™-TX and PHOTOBIO™-T Greenhouse and Indoor Grow Lights. It also added Canada’s Greenstar Plant Products, Aurora Innovations, and House & Garden, Inc., to its brand portfolio.
