= Equity ratio =

The equity ratio is a financial ratio indicating the relative proportion of equity used to finance a company's assets. The two components are often taken from the firm's balance sheet or statement of financial position (so-called book value), but the ratio may also be calculated using market values for both, if the company's equities are publicly traded.

== Interpretation ==
The equity ratio is a good indicator of the level of leverage used by a company. The equity ratio measures the proportion of the total assets that are financed by stockholders, as opposed to creditors. A low equity ratio will produce good results for stockholders as long as the company earns a rate of return on assets that is greater than the interest rate paid to creditors.

== Relationship to debt ratio ==
The equity ratio is closely related to the debt ratio, since both are derived from the balance-sheet identity that total assets are financed by a combination of liabilities and shareholders' equity.

When total liabilities and total equity are the only financing sources considered, the equity ratio and debt ratio are complementary measures. A higher equity ratio implies a lower proportion of assets financed by debt, while a lower equity ratio indicates greater reliance on creditor financing and therefore greater financial leverage.
