= Price–sales ratio =

Financial metric comparing a company's stock price to its revenue

The price-to-sales ratio (P/S ratio or PSR) is a financial ratio used to assess a company's market value relative to its revenue. It is calculated by dividing the company's market capitalization by its total revenue over a specified period, typically the trailing twelve months (TTM), or equivalently, by dividing the unit price of each share by the per-share revenue. Investors use this metric to gauge how much they are paying for each dollar of a company's sales, often as an alternative to the price-to-earnings ratio (P/E ratio) when earnings are negative or volatile.

The P/S ratio is particularly useful for valuing unprofitable companies, as it relies on revenue rather than profit, which may be absent or distorted by accounting practices. A lower ratio (e.g., below 1.0) may suggest a stock is undervalued, while a higher ratio could indicate overvaluation, though interpretation depends on industry norms and company context. The ratio can also track a stock's valuation over time or compare companies within the same sector.

== Calculation ==
The price-to-sales ratio is expressed as:

$$\text{P/S Ratio} = \frac{\text{Market Capitalization}}{\text{Revenue}} = \frac{\text{Stock Price per Share}}{\text{Revenue per Share}}$$

- Market capitalization: The total value of a company's outstanding shares, calculated as stock price multiplied by the number of shares.
- Revenue: Total sales or income over a period, typically the trailing twelve months (TTM) unless otherwise specified.

A justified P/S ratio adjusts this metric based on fundamentals, derived from the Gordon Growth Model. It incorporates the profit margin, dividend payout ratio, sustainable growth rate (g), and required rate of return (r):

$$\text{Justified P/S} = \text{Profit Margin} \times \text{Payout Ratio} \times \frac{1 + g}{r - g}$$

Here, the growth rate g is calculated as:

$$g = \text{Retention Ratio} \times \text{Return on Equity}$$

where the retention ratio is 1 minus the payout ratio, and return on equity (ROE) reflects profitability relative to shareholders' equity.

== Interpretation ==
A low P/S ratio may indicate a potential bargain, but it does not account for profitability or expenses, limiting its standalone usefulness. It is most effective for unprofitable firms lacking a P/E ratio or for comparing similar companies within a sector, where revenue patterns are more consistent. However, P/S ratios vary widely across industries due to differences in typical capital structures (e.g., technology vs. utilities), making cross-sector comparisons less reliable.

== See also ==
- Financial ratio
- Price-to-earnings ratio
- Price-to-cash-flow ratio
