= Return on brand =

Indicator of the effectiveness of brand use by companies

The return on brand (ROB) is an indicator used to measure brand management performance. It is an indicator of the effectiveness of brand use in terms of generating net income, a special case of return on assets.

ROB is calculated as the ratio of net income to brand value:

$\mathrm{ROB} = \frac{\mbox{net income}}{\mbox{brand value}}$

== Usage ==
Return on brand can be used in multi-criteria models for assessing the effectiveness of branding, as well as intellectual capital (since the brand is a component of relational capital).

It is believed that if the brand value of the company increases, its net profit should also increase, otherwise the value of ROB will decrease, which indicates a decrease in the effectiveness of brand management in terms of creating net profit. At the same time, if the brand value falls, and this does not lead to a decrease in the net profit of the enterprise, the ROB value increases, which indicates a relative increase in the brand management efficiency. The change in brand value itself, although it makes it possible to judge the effectiveness of brand management, is only indirectly, since the company does not sell the brand directly, because it is an intangible asset associated directly with company and its products. If a company sells its brand as an intangible asset to another organization, it terminates branding events with respect to it, since this function transfers to the new owner of the brand. Thus, ROB allows to clarify how effective it is for a company to change the value of the brand associated with it. For this reason, the diagnosis of the impact of brand value on a business is relevant only with a joint analysis of ROB.

== Application examples ==
Return on brand can be applied in several branding assessment models:

The approach of T. Munoz and S. Kumar, who propose to build a branding assessment system based on three classes of metrics (perception metrics, behavioral metrics, financial metrics), which make it possible to evaluate branding effectiveness.

A model for assessing the effectiveness of branding based on the concept of contact branding, which is based on the fact that by isolating and controlling points of contact between the brand and the consumer, it is possible to evaluate the effectiveness of brand management.

== See also ==
- Return on capital (ROC)
- Return on equity (ROE)
- Return on investment (ROI)
- Rate of return on a portfolio
- List of business and finance abbreviations
