= Form 6-K =

U.S. SEC filing used by foreign private issuers

Form 6K is an SEC filing submitted to the U.S. Securities and Exchange Commission used by certain foreign private issuers to provide information that is:

- Required to be made public in the country of its domicile
- Filed with and made public by a foreign stock exchange on which its securities are traded
- Distributed to security holders.

The report must be furnished promptly after such material is made public. The form is not considered "filed" because of Section 18 (for liability purposes). This is the only information furnished by foreign private issuers between annual reports, since such issuers are not required to file on Forms 10-Q or 8-K.
