= Time to value =

Time to value (TTV) is a measure of the length of time necessary to undertake a project and realize the benefits of the solution. The concept is used to help decision makers evaluate the proposed benefit of an investment in time and/or money. It is a similar concept to return on investment (ROI), but instead of realizing the financial success of an investment, it implies achieving the effectiveness of an investment. This is applied mostly to added technology—data center hardware, network infrastructure, system security, etc. whereby the promised improvement becomes measurable. It can even be argued that in cases such as data security, TTV is more important than ROI since the security may only have financial benefits in banking and commercial industries, but has value in the protection of personal and/or corporate data—in every industry.

== Measurement and benefits realisation ==
Time to value depends on how the expected benefit of a project, product, or system is defined. In project management, benefits management provides a structured way to identify, plan, track, and verify the positive impacts of public investment across portfolios, programmes, and projects. Benefits are commonly recorded in a benefits register or benefits profile and supported by a benefits realisation plan, which is used to monitor when expected value has been delivered.

In technology and software projects, time to value is often used to describe the period between implementation, adoption, or onboarding and the point at which a user or organisation obtains a measurable benefit. This differs from project completion, because a project may be delivered before its expected benefits have been realised or verified.

== Limitation ==
A limitation of time to value is that the point at which value has been achieved may be difficult to define consistently. Benefits may depend on the selected measure, the timing of adoption or operational use, and whether the expected outcome can be verified after implementation.

== See also ==
- Return on investment
