= Tangible common equity =

Total common equity less intangible assets

Tangible common equity (TCE), the subset of shareholders' equity that is not preferred equity and not intangible assets, is an uncommonly used measure of a company's financial strength. It indicates how much ownership equity owners of common stock would receive in the event of a company's liquidation. During the financial and economic crisis of 2008–2009, it gained public popularity as a measure of the viability of large commercial banks.

When used in a ratio with tangible common assets, it measures a bank's ability to absorb losses (e.g., homeowners defaulting on mortgages) before becoming insolvent. It is one of the factors considered by the Office of the Comptroller of the Currency to determine if a bank has become insolvent.

== Formula ==
- TCE = total equity – intangible assets – goodwill – preferred stock
- tangible assets = total assets – intangible assets – goodwill – preferred stock
- TCE ratio = TCE / tangible assets
- Leverage ratio = (total assets – intangible assets – goodwill) / TCE

== Example ==
On February 27, 2009, the U.S. Government converted preferred shares to common shares to increase Citigroup's tangible common equity. In this example, the company's total equity remained the same, but its preferred equity decreased, thereby increasing common equity (and TCE).

== See also ==
- Bank stress tests
- Return on tangible equity
- Intrinsic value (finance) § Equity
