= Return on capital =

Measure of profitability relative to invested capital

Return on capital (ROC), or return on invested capital (ROIC), is a ratio used in finance, valuation and accounting, as a measure of the profitability and value-creating potential of companies relative to the amount of capital invested by shareholders and other debtholders. It indicates how effective a company is at turning capital into profits.

The ratio is calculated by dividing the after tax operating income (NOPAT) by the average book-value of the invested capital (IC).

== Return on invested capital formula ==
ROIC = NOPAT/(Average Invested Capital)

There are three main components of this measurement:

- While ratios such as return on equity and return on assets use net income as the numerator, ROIC uses net operating income after tax (NOPAT), which means that after-tax expenses (income) from financing activities are added back to (deducted from) net income.
- While many financial computations use market value instead of book value (for instance, calculating debt-to-equity ratios or calculating the weights for the weighted average cost of capital (WACC)), ROIC uses book values of the invested capital as the denominator. This procedure is done because, unlike market values which reflect future expectations in efficient markets, book values more closely reflect the amount of initial capital invested to generate a return.
- The denominator represents the average value of the invested capital rather than the value of the end of the year. This is because the NOPAT represents a sum of money flows, while the value of the invested capital changes every day (e.g., the invested capital on December 31 could be 30% lower than the invested capital on December 30). Because the exact average is difficult to calculate, it is often estimated by taking the average between the IC at the beginning of the year and the IC at the end of the year.

Some practitioners make an additional adjustment to the formula to add depreciation, amortization, and depletion charges back to the numerator. These charges are considered by some to be "non-cash expenses" which are often included as part of operating expenses. The practice of adding these back is said to more closely reflect the cash return of a firm over a given period of time. However, others (such as Warren Buffett) argue that depreciation should not be excluded seeing that it represents a real cash outflow. When a company purchases a depreciating asset, the cost is not immediately expensed on the income statement. Instead, it is capitalized on the balance sheet as an asset. Over time, the depreciation expenses on the income statement will reduce the asset value on the balance sheet. In turn, depreciation represents the delayed expensing of the initial cash outflow that purchased the asset, and is thus a rather liberal accounting practice.

== Relationship with WACC ==
Because financial theory states that the value of an investment is determined by both the amount of and risk of its expected cash flows to an investor, ROIC and its relationship to the weighted average cost of capital (WACC).

The cost of capital is the return expected from investors for bearing the risk that the projected cash flows of an investment deviate from expectations. It is said that for investments in which future cash flows are incrementally less certain, rational investors require incrementally higher rates of return as compensation for bearing higher degrees of risk. In corporate finance, WACC is a common measurement of the minimum expected weighted average return of all investors in a company given the riskiness of its future cash flows.

Since return on invested capital is said to measure the ability of a firm to generate a return on its capital, and since WACC is said to measure the minimum expected return demanded by the firm's capital providers, the difference between ROIC and WACC is sometimes referred to as a firm's "excess return", or "economic profit".

== See also ==
- Cash flow return on investment (CFROI)
- Fairfield Plaza, Inc. v. Commissioner
- Negative return (finance)
- Profit maximization
- Profitability
- Rate of profit
- Rate of return on a portfolio
- Recovery of capital doctrine
- Return on assets (RoA)
- Return on brand (ROB)
- Return on capital employed (ROCE)
- Return on investment (ROI)
- Return on net assets (RoNA)
- Tendency of the rate of profit to fall
