= Fairfield Plaza, Inc. v. Commissioner =

- Court: United States Tax Court
- Full case name: Fairfield Plaza, Inc. v. Commissioner of Internal Revenue
- Decided: January 23, 1963
- Citation: 39 T.C. 706 (1963)

Court membership
- Judge sitting: Bruce

Case opinions
- Decision by: Bruce

Laws applied
- Internal Revenue Code

Keywords
- Return on capital

Fairfield Plaza, Inc. v. Commissioner, 39 T.C. 706 (1963) was a case before the United States Tax Court discussing timing alternatives in taxing the return of capital.

== Background ==
=== Facts ===
The taxpayer purchased a piece of land, divided it into two tracts, and made certain improvements.

The taxpayer sold both of the tracts of land in different years and allocated his basis between the two tracts based upon area. The taxpayer also allocated certain amounts that had been placed into escrow between the two tracts. The amounts in escrow were for improvements to the tract that was sold last.

=== Tax return ===
The IRS determined that the taxpayer improperly allocated these allocations in its tax return.

==== Issues ====
The taxpayer challenged the IRS's determination, claiming that the IRS erroneously determined the proper allocation of his basis between the two tracts of land and that the IRS erroneously allocated the amounts that were placed in escrow for improvements between the two tracts of land.

== Opinion of the court ==
The court affirmed, finding that the allocation of basis was not proper within the meaning of Treas. Reg. § 1.61-6, reasoning that:

- the relative values of the two tracts were different
- the tract that was sold last was of a greater value
- the taxpayer was not entitled to allocate the amounts placed into escrow between the two tracts of land. The court reasoned that the amounts in question were used for improvements to the tract that was sold last.
