= Earnings call =

Meeting revealing a public company's finances

An earnings call is a teleconference or webcast in which a public company discusses its financial results for a reporting period, often providing earnings guidance for future performance. The term stems from earnings per share (EPS), calculated as net income (the "bottom line" on the income statement divided by the number of outstanding shares). Earnings calls typically accompany a press release summarizing results and are often paired with mandatory filings under local securities laws. These calls are a key mechanism for companies worldwide to communicate financial health and strategy to investors, financial analysts, and stakeholders, with practices varying by region and regulatory framework.

In the United States, a 2014 survey by the National Investor Relations Institute (NIRI) found that 97% of its member companies conducted quarterly earnings calls, with most offering webcasts. Globally, listed companies on exchanges such as the London Stock Exchange (LSE), Tokyo Stock Exchange (TSE), Shanghai Stock Exchange (SSE), National Stock Exchange of India, Bombay Stock Exchange, and others also hold similar calls, though the frequency and format differ across jurisdictions.

== Format ==
Generally, the call will begin with a company official, typically the Investor Relations Officer (IRO), reading a safe harbor statement to limit the company's liability should actual results prove different from expected indicators reported in the discussion. Then one or more company officials, often including the Chief executive officer and Chief financial officer, will discuss the operational results and financial statements for the period just ended and their outlook for the future. The teleconference will then be opened for questions by investors, financial analysts, and other call participants. Management will answer many of these questions, although if the data is unavailable to them they may decline or defer response. Depending on the size and complexity of the company, the difference between actual and expected results, and other factors, the length of the call will vary.

There is no general requirement for how far in advance notice of a call must be given. However, keeping the investor and analyst communities happy is generally considered to be part of management's job, so the call will usually be announced a few days or weeks in advance. Company websites generally have a section titled Investor Relations or Investors, where call schedules and archived past calls will typically be posted.

Many companies are tracked by financial analysts that publish estimates of earnings per share (EPS). The company may also provide financial guidance as to what EPS are likely to be. If management knows that its results are going to be significantly different from its guidance or from analyst expectations, it may choose to make a preannouncement of differing results. See also Earnings management.

== United States ==
If the call occurs within 48 hours of a press release filed with the United States Securities and Exchange Commission (SEC) on Form 8-K and meets certain other criteria, there is no obligation to separately report the call to the SEC. Otherwise, it must be reported on Form 8-K. If the call contains non-Generally Accepted Accounting Principles (GAAP) information, then there are additional requirements under SEC regulations, including Regulation FD.

Companies headquartered in the United States with securities traded on a US-based stock market or other exchange are required to file audited annual reports with the SEC on Form 10-K following the end of a fiscal year and unaudited reports on Form 10-Q following the end of a fiscal quarter. These companies announce earnings and generally hold an earnings call quarterly.

Some companies with shares publicly listed also have American Depositary Receipts (ADRs) that are traded on US stock exchanges and are required to file Forms 20-F and 6K with the SEC. They are likely to have their earnings announcements and calls coordinated with the schedule required in the country where their shares are traded.
