= Receivables turnover ratio =

Measure of how efficiently a firm collects credit sales from customers

Receivable turnover ratio or debtor's turnover ratio is an accounting measure used to measure how effective a company is in extending credit as well as collecting debts. The receivables turnover ratio is an activity ratio, measuring how efficiently a firm uses its assets.

Formula:

$\mathrm{Receivable\ turnover\ ratio} = {\mathrm{Net\ receivable\ sales}\over\mathrm{Average\ net\ receivables}}$

A high ratio implies either that a company operates on a cash basis or that its extension of credit and collection of accounts receivable is efficient. While a low ratio implies the company is not making the timely collection of credit.

A good accounts receivable turnover depends on how quickly a business recovers its dues or, in simple terms how high or low the turnover ratio is. For instance, with a 30-day payment policy, if the customers take 46 days to pay back, the Accounts Receivable Turnover is low.

== Relation ratios ==
- Days' sales in receivables = 365 / Receivable turnover ratio
- Average collection period = (Days × AR)/(Credit sales)
- Average debtor collection period = (Trade receivables)/(Credit sales) × 365 = Average collection period in days,
- Average creditor payment period = (Trade payables)/(Credit purchases) × 365 = Average Payment period in days,

== Use in liquidity analysis ==
Receivables turnover is commonly used as an activity ratio to assess how efficiently a company collects cash from customers. Financial analysis frameworks group receivables turnover with related measures such as days of sales outstanding, inventory turnover, and payables turnover because these ratios help evaluate the efficiency of a company's operating cycle.

A higher receivables turnover ratio generally indicates that receivables are being collected more quickly, while a lower ratio may indicate slower collections, less restrictive credit terms, or problems with customer payment. The ratio is most useful when compared with the same company's prior periods or with companies in the same industry, because normal collection practices vary by business model and credit policy.

== See also ==
- Debtor days
- Cash flow
- Working capital
