= Earnings report =

Public disclosure of a company's periodic financial performance

An earnings report is a public disclosure issued by a company, typically quarterly or annually, that shares its financial performance with investors and stakeholders. Publicly traded companies must provide these disclosures for transparency, as required by bodies like the U.S. Securities and Exchange Commission (SEC).

While financial statements—such as the balance sheet, income statement, and cash flow statement—provide the raw data, an earnings report distills key metrics like revenue and earnings per share (EPS), adding management commentary and forward-looking guidance. In some regulatory contexts, the term may loosely refer to filings like the quarterly Form 10-Q or yearly Form 10-K. Informally, it is sometimes used as a synonym for the income statement alone.

Earnings reports help investors, financial analysts, and management evaluate a company's profitability and efficiency. In the United States, companies file quarterly reports via the Form 10-Q for the first three quarters, with Annual reports filed via the Form 10-K. An earnings call often accompanies these disclosures, where executives discuss results and plans.

The release of an earnings report can affect a company's stock price. Strong results that beat expectations may lift prices, while weak ones can cause drops. Companies may also announce dividends or updates in these reports.

== Potential changes to earnings reports in the US ==
In September 2025, US President Donald Trump posted on Truth Social that he believed the US should change quarterly reporting requirements to semi-annually. Around the same time, The Long-Term Stock Exchange said it planned to petition the SEC adopt the change. President Trump argued the move would "save money and allow managers to focus on properly running their companies". However, critics argue the move could reduce transparency among investors.

The proposal echoes a 2018 op-ed by JPMorgan Chase CEO Jamie Dimon and chair of Berkshire Hathaway, Warren Buffett, which argues against a short-term mindset for businesses and investors. Dimon and Buffett argued the "pressure to meet short-term earnings estimates has contributed to the decline in the number of public companies in America over the [prior two] decades". However, while they advocated for reducing or eliminating quarterly earnings guidance, they were not inherently opposed to quarterly reporting and the transparency it provides.

Public companies listed in Europe and the U.K are no longer required to report quarterly earnings following rule changes in 2013 and 2014, respectively.

== See also ==
- Earnings call
- Earnings guidance
- Earnings surprise
- Financial statement
- Income statement
- Profit warning
- Quarterly financial report
