= Loan life coverage ratio =

Loan Life Coverage Ratio (LLCR) is a ratio commonly used in project finance. The ratio is defined as: Net Present Value of Cashflow Available for Debt Service ("CFADS") / Outstanding Debt in the period. Financial modelling of LLCR is now a standard metric calculated in a project finance model and has been standardized to a large extent but always needs to be aligned with local practice of the financiers as described in the transaction term sheet.

NPV(CFADS) is measured only up until the maturity of the debt tranche.

The ratio is one of the aspects used for estimates of the credit quality of a project from a lender's perspective.

Related ratios are: Project Life Coverage Ratio (PLCR) and Reserve Life Coverage Ratio (RLCR).

The ratio usually is in a range from 1.25 for highly geared infrastructure investment to 2.5 or higher in an investments with more insecure income, such as oil and gas transactions.

== Use in credit analysis ==
The loan life coverage ratio is used in project finance as a forward-looking measure of debt repayment capacity over the remaining life of the loan. Unlike the debt service coverage ratio, which is generally calculated for a single period, LLCR incorporates the present value of projected cash flow available for debt service over the debt tenor relative to the debt outstanding at a given point in time.

This makes the ratio particularly relevant in long-term lending and project finance, where lenders assess not only near-term debt service performance but also the overall ability of projected project cash flows to support the outstanding debt balance through maturity.

== See also ==
- Debt service coverage ratio
