= Asset turnover =

Financial ratio

In finance, asset turnover (ATO), total asset turnover, or asset turns is a financial ratio that measures the efficiency of a company's use of its assets in generating sales revenue or sales income to the company. Asset turnover is considered to be a profitability ratio, which is a group of financial ratios that measure how efficiently a company uses assets. Asset turnover can be furthered subdivided into fixed asset turnover, which measures a company's use of its fixed assets to generate revenue, and working capital turnover, which measures a company's use of its working capital (current assets minus liabilities) to generate revenue. Total asset turnover ratios can be used to calculate return on equity (ROE) figures as part of DuPont analysis. As a financial and activity ratio, and as part of DuPont analysis, asset turnover is a part of company fundamental analysis.

Companies with low profit margins tend to have high asset turnover, while those with high profit margins have low asset turnover. Companies in the retail industry tend to have a very high turnover ratio, due mainly to cutthroat and competitive pricing.

$$\text{ATO} = \frac{\text{Net Sales Revenue}}{\text{Average Total Assets}}$$

- "Sales" is the value of "Net Sales" or "Sales" from the company's income statement
- "Average Total Assets" is the average of the values of "Total assets" from the company's balance sheet in the beginning and the end of the fiscal period. It is calculated by adding up the assets at the beginning of the period and the assets at the end of the period, then dividing that number by two. This method can produce unreliable results for businesses that experience significant intra-year fluctuations. For such businesses, it is advisable to use some other formula for Average Total Assets.
  - Alternatively, "Average Total Assets" can be ending total assets.
