= Recovery of capital doctrine =

In United States tax law the recovery of capital doctrine protects a portion of investment receipts from being taxed, namely the amount that was initially invested. This is because the investor is receiving his or her own money which is being returned to him or her.

For example, if a person purchased stock in a company totalling $10,000 and then sold it a few years later for $15,000, only $5,000 would be eligible for taxation. The initial $10,000 is protected under the recovery of capital doctrine.
