= Quarterly financial report =

Financial summary covering a three-month period

In the private sector, a quarterly financial report is a type of financial report that encapsulates a company's financial performance over a three-month span. This reporting is mandated by various stock exchanges globally to ensure investors receive timely updates on a company's financial health. private sector financial reports highlight the overall outcomes of transactions for a specific period.

Within the public sector, quarterly financial reports detail a government's income and spending over a quarter of its designated fiscal year, which varies by jurisdiction (e.g., in the United States, the federal government's fiscal year differs from that of state or local governments). Public sector reports emphasize how transactions influence short-term financing needs, with decisions connected to annual or biennial budget allocations and a focus on balances tied to immediate governmental funding, such as the operating budget.

In the United States, the Form 10-Q serves as the quarterly financial report required by the Securities and Exchange Commission for public companies, providing detailed information on financial position, income, and cash flows for the reporting period.

== See also ==
- Earnings report
- Income statement
