= RAQSCI =

The RAQSCI model is a mnemonic summary of a business model used to define and structure business requirements. With elements ranked in order of importance, RAQSCI stands for:

- Regulatory
- Assurance of supply
- Quality
- Service
- Cost (or commercial)
- Innovation.

The World Bank recommends the model as "an effective way to ensure that [borrowers'] Procurement Objectives are comprehensive", as defining such objectives is seen as a critical step in formulating an effective bid for World Bank project funding. This model is used educationally to ensure that procurement professionals adopt a broad perspective on business needs and do not focus exclusively on costs.
