= Quarter on quarter =

Quarter-on-quarter or quarter-over-quarter, abbreviated as QOQ is a term of art in accounting, finance and economics. It may refer to a comparison of data in the current quarter to the same data in the previous quarter. For example, if the volume of sales was 105 units in 2019Q2, 100 units in 2020Q1, and 102 units in 2020Q2, then the sale volume has increased in 2020Q2 quarter-over-quarter (i.e., comparing it to 2020Q1), but it has decreased year-over-year (i.e., comparing it to 2019Q2).

The term also applies to a comparison of data in a period of the current quarter to the same period in the previous quarter. For example, the comparison of sales in April (i.e., the first month of Q2) to sales in January would be a quarter-over-quarter comparison.

It is sometimes abbreviated as q/q.

== See also ==
- year-over-year
