= Cash-flow-to-debt ratio =

Financial metric assessing cash flow relative to total debt

The cash flow to debt ratio is a financial ratio that measures a company's ability to cover its total debt with its operating cash flow. It is calculated by dividing the cash flow from operations by the total debt outstanding, providing insight into how many years it would take to repay all debt assuming constant cash flow. This ratio is widely used by financial analysts and creditors to evaluate a company's liquidity and financial health, particularly its capacity to manage debt without relying on external financing.

Unlike the debt service coverage ratio (DSCR), which focuses on annual debt payments, the cash flow to debt ratio considers the entire debt balance, making it a broader indicator of leverage. A higher ratio suggests stronger debt repayment ability, while a lower ratio may signal financial strain.

== Calculation ==
The cash flow to debt ratio is expressed as:

$$\text{Cash Flow to Debt Ratio} = \frac{\text{Cash Flow from Operations}}{\text{Total Debt}}$$

Where:

- Cash Flow from Operations is the cash generated from core business activities, typically found in the cash flow statement of a company's financial statements, excluding cash flows from financing or investing activities.
- Total Debt includes all short-term and long-term liabilities, such as loans and bonds, reported on the balance sheet.

For example, if a company has $50 million in cash flow from operations and $200 million in total debt, its cash flow to debt ratio is 0.25, meaning it generates 25% of its debt in cash flow annually.

== Interpretation ==
A ratio above 1 indicates that a company could theoretically repay all debt within a year using operating cash flow, though this is rare. Ratios between 0.2 and 0.5 are common for healthy firms, depending on industry norms—higher values suggest better coverage, while lower values (e.g., below 0.1) may raise concerns about solvency. Unlike the price-to-cash-flow ratio, which assesses market valuation, this ratio focuses solely on debt management. Context, such as industry standards and economic conditions, is critical for interpretation.

== See also ==
- Debt service coverage ratio
- Price-to-cash flow ratio
- Financial ratio
