= Weighted average return on assets =

Collective rates of return on the various types of assets of a company

The weighted average return on assets (WARA) is the collective rates of return on the various types of tangible and intangible assets of a company.

The presumption of a WARA is that each class of a company's asset base (such as manufacturing equipment, contracts, software, brand names, etc.) carries its own rate of return, each unique to the asset's underlying operational risk as well as its ability to attain debt and equity.

Tangible assets, generally speaking, carry a lower rate of return due to two factors:

- Debt financing—tangible assets can be provided as collateral in attracting debt capital, which typically require a lower rate of return than equity capital
- Stability of earnings—tangible assets tend to provide more certainty in expected earnings, which reduces risk to the financier of the asset

Intangible assets, in contrast, carry a higher rate of return due to the same factors above.

Averaging these rates of returns, as a percentage of the total asset base, produces a WARA. In theory, the WARA should generate the same cost of capital as the Weighted average cost of capital, or WACC. The theory holds true because the operating entity is considered fundamentally equivalent to the combined assets of the company. Therefore, the measure of risks across each are equivalent. In the case of the operating entity, risk is measured against the WACC, while in the case of the combined assets, risk is measured by the WARA. Reconciliations between the two are typically required as a component of a Purchase price allocation in accordance with the Financial Accounting Standards Board's ("FASB") Statement of Financial Accounting Standards No. 141 “Business Combinations” (“SFAS 141”).
