= Return on assets =

Measure of how profitable a company's assets are in generating revenue

The return on assets (ROA) shows the percentage of how profitable a company's assets are in generating revenue.

ROA can be computed as below:

$\mathrm{ROA} = \frac{\mbox{Net Income}}{\mbox{Average Total Assets}}$

The phrase return on average assets (ROAA) is also used, to emphasize that average assets are used in the above formula.

This number tells you what the company can do with what it has, i.e. how many dollars of earnings they derive from each dollar of assets they control. It's a useful number for comparing competing companies in the same industry. The number will vary widely across different industries. Return on assets gives an indication of the capital intensity of the company, which will depend on the industry; companies that require large initial investments will generally have lower return on assets. ROAs over 5% are generally considered good.

== Usage ==
Return on assets is one of the elements used in financial analysis using the Du Pont Identity.

== See also ==
- Return on equity (ROE)
- List of business and finance abbreviations
- Rate of return on a portfolio
- Return on brand (ROB)
- Return on capital (ROC)
- Return on investment (ROI)
- Weighted average return on assets (WARA)
