= Debt ratio =

Financial ratio covering the percentage of assets funded by debt

The debt ratio or debt to assets ratio is a financial ratio which indicates the percentage of a company's assets which are funded by debt. It is measured as the ratio of total debt to total assets, which is also equal to the ratio of total liabilities and total assets:

Debt ratio = (Total Debts)/(Total Assets) = (Total Liabilities)/(Total Assets)

Financial analysts and financial managers use the ratio in assessing the financial position of the firm. Companies with high debt to asset ratios are said to be highly leveraged, and are associated with greater risk. A high debt to asset ratio may also indicate a low borrowing capacity, which in turn will limit the firm's financial flexibility.

== Interpretation and limitations ==
The debt ratio shows the proportion of a company’s total assets that is financed by debt. A higher debt ratio suggests that a larger share of asset financing comes from creditors rather than equity holders, which may indicate higher financial risk, especially if earnings or cash flows are insufficient to cover obligations. A lower debt ratio generally indicates lower financial leverage and greater resilience to changes in interest rates or economic downturns.

== See also ==
- Equity ratio
- Debt-to-income ratio, for households
- Debt-to-GDP ratio, for governments
- Hamada's equation
