= DuPont analysis =

Expression which breaks ROE (return on equity) into three parts

Graphical representation of DuPont analysis.

Dupont analysis is a tool used in financial analysis, where return on equity (ROE) is separated into its component parts.

Useful in several contexts, this "decomposition" of ROE allows financial managers to focus on the key metrics of financial performance individually, and thereby to identify strengths and weaknesses within the company that should be addressed. Similarly, it allows investors to compare the operational efficiency of two comparable firms.

== History ==
The name derives from the Dupont company, which began using this formula in the 1920s. A DuPont salesman from the company submitted an internal efficiency report to his superiors in 1914 that contained the formula.

== Basic formula ==
The DuPont analysis breaks down ROE into three component parts, which may then be managed individually:

- Profitability: measured by profit margin
- Asset efficiency: measured by asset turnover
- Financial leverage: measured by equity multiplier

ROE = (Profit margin)×(Asset turnover)×(Equity multiplier) = (Net profit)/Sales×Sales/(Average Total Assets)×(Average Total Assets)/(Average Equity) = (Net Profit)/Equity

Or

ROA = Profit/Sales×Sales/Assets

And

ROE = ROA×Leverage

== ROE analysis ==
The DuPont analysis breaks down ROE (that is, the returns that investors receive from a single dollar of equity) into three distinct elements. This analysis enables the manager or analyst to understand the source of superior (or inferior) return by comparison with companies in similar industries (or between industries). See Return on equity § The DuPont formula for further context.

The DuPont analysis is less useful for industries such as investment banking, in which the underlying elements are not meaningful (see related discussion: Valuation (finance) § Valuing financial services firms). Variations of the DuPont analysis have been developed for industries where the elements are weakly meaningful, for example:

=== High margin industries ===
Some industries, such as the fashion industry, may derive a substantial portion of their income from selling at a higher margin, rather than higher sales. For high-end fashion brands, increasing sales without sacrificing margin may be critical. The DuPont analysis allows analysts to determine which of the elements is dominant in any change of ROE.

=== High turnover industries ===
Certain types of retail operations, particularly stores, may have very low profit margins on sales, and relatively moderate leverage. In contrast, though, groceries may have very high turnover, selling a significant multiple of their assets per year. The ROE of such firms may be particularly dependent on performance of this metric, and hence asset turnover may be studied extremely carefully for signs of under-, or, over-performance. For example, same-store sales of many retailers is considered important as an indication that the firm is deriving greater profits from existing stores (rather than showing improved performance by continually opening stores).

=== High leverage industries ===
Some sectors, such as the financial sector, rely on high leverage to generate acceptable ROE. Other industries would see high levels of leverage as unacceptably risky. DuPont analysis enables third parties that rely primarily on their financial statements to compare leverage among similar companies.

== ROA and ROE ratio ==
The return on assets (ROA) ratio developed by DuPont for its own use is now used by many firms to evaluate how effectively assets are used. It measures the combined effects of profit margins and asset turnover.

$$\text{ROA} = \frac{\text{Net Income}}{\text{Revenue}} \times \frac{\text{Revenue}}{\text{Average Total Assets}} = \frac{\text{Net income}}{\text{Average Total Assets}}$$

The return on equity (ROE) ratio is a measure of the rate of return to stockholders. Decomposing the ROE into various factors influencing company performance is often called the DuPont system.

$$\text{ROE} = \frac{\text{Net Income}}{\text{Average Total Equity}} = \frac{\text{Net Income}}{\text{Pretax Income}} \times \frac{\text{Pretax Income}}{\text{EBIT}} \times \frac{\text{EBIT}}{\text{Revenue}} \times \frac{\text{Revenue}}{\text{Average Total Assets}} \times \frac{\text{Average Total Assets}}{\text{Average Total Equity}}$$
Where
- Net Income = pre-tax income after taxes
- Equity = shareholders' equity
- EBIT = Earnings before interest and taxes
- Pretax Income is often reported as Earnings Before Taxes or EBT

This decomposition presents various ratios used in fundamental analysis.

- The company's tax burden is (Net income ÷ Pretax profit). This is the proportion of the company's profits retained after paying income taxes. [NI/EBT]
- The company's interest burden is (Pretax income ÷ EBIT). This will be 1.00 for a firm with no debt or financial leverage. [EBT/EBIT]
- The company's operating income margin or return on sales (ROS) is (EBIT ÷ Revenue). This is the operating income per dollar of sales. [EBIT/Revenue]
- The company's asset turnover (ATO) is (Revenue ÷ Average Total Assets).
- The company's equity multiplier is (Average Total Assets ÷ Average Total Equity). This is a measure of financial leverage.

== See also ==
- Shareholder value
