= Times interest earned =

Ratio measuring a firm's ability to meet its interest payments

Times interest earned (TIE) or interest coverage ratio is a measure of a company's ability to honor its debt payments. It may be calculated as either EBIT or EBITDA divided by the total interest expense.

Times-Interest-Earned = (EBIT or EBITDA)/(Interest Expense)

When the interest coverage ratio is smaller than one, the company is not generating enough cash from its operations EBIT to meet its interest obligations. The company would then have to either use cash on hand to make up the difference or borrow funds. Typically, it is a warning sign when interest coverage falls below 2.5x.

== Times interest earned definition ==
The times interest earned ratio indicates the extent of which earnings are available to meet interest payments.

A lower times interest earned ratio means less earnings are available to meet interest payments and that the business is more vulnerable to increases in interest rates and being unable to meet their existing outstanding loan obligations.

== See also ==
- Financial ratio
- Leverage (finance)
- EBIT
- EBITDA
- Debt service coverage ratio

EBITDA is considered to be a better measure of Interest Coverage ratio.
