= Cash-flow return on investment =

Cash-flow return on investment (CFROI) is a valuation model that assumes the stock market sets prices based on cash flow, not on corporate performance and earnings.

$$\text{CFROI} = \frac {\text{Cash flow}} {\text{Market recapitalization}}$$

For the corporation, it is essentially internal rate of return (IRR). CFROI is compared to a hurdle rate to determine if investment/product is performing adequately. The hurdle rate is the total cost of capital for the corporation calculated by a mix of cost of debt financing plus investors' expected return on equity investments. The CFROI must exceed the hurdle rate to satisfy both the debt financing and the investors expected return.

$$\text{CFROI} = \frac {\text{Gross cash flow}} {\text{Gross investment}}$$

Michael J. Mauboussin in his 2006 book More Than You Know: Finding Financial Wisdom in Unconventional Places, quoted an analysis by Credit Suisse First Boston, that, measured by CFROI, performance of companies tend to converge after five years in terms of their survival rates.

The CFROI for a firm or a division can then be written as follows:

$$\text{CFROI} = \frac {\text{Gross cash flow} - \text{Economic depreciation}} {\text{Gross investment}}$$

This annuity is called the economic depreciation:

$$\text{Economic depreciation} = \frac {K_c} {\left ( 1+K_c \right )^n-1}$$

where n is the expected life of the asset and K_{c} is the replacement cost in current dollars.

== See also ==
- Return of capital
