= Price-to-cash flow ratio =

Financial metric comparing stock price to cash flow per share

The price/cash flow ratio (also called price-to-cash flow ratio or P/CF), is a financial ratio used to compare a company's market value to its cash flow. It is calculated by dividing the company's market cap by the company's operating cash flow in the most recent fiscal year (or the most recent four fiscal quarters); or, equivalently, divide the per-share stock price by the per-share operating cash flow.

It is commonly used by financial analysts to assess investment value, especially for firms with significant non-cash expenses like depreciation. A lower P/CF suggests a stock may be undervalued, while a higher ratio could indicate overvaluation, though context—such as industry norms or economic conditions—matters in interpretation.

For example, if the stock price for two companies is $25/share and one company has a cash flow of $5/share (25/5=5) and the other company has a cash flow of $10/share (25/10=2.5), then if all else is equal, the company with the higher cash flow (lower ratio, P/CF=2.5) has the better value.

== Interpretation and limitations ==
The price/cash flow ratio is often used as an alternative to earnings-based valuation multiples because cash flow may be less affected by non-cash expenses and accounting estimates than earnings. Cash flow multiples may therefore be useful when comparing companies with large depreciation, amortisation, or other non-cash charges, although comparisons are most meaningful among companies in the same industry or with similar business models.

A limitation of the ratio is that operating cash flow can be affected by changes in working capital, timing of cash receipts and payments, and differences in cash-flow classification. The statement of cash flows separates cash flows into operating, investing, and financing activities, and investors use this information to assess a company's ability to generate future cash flows, meet obligations, and return cash to investors.

== See also ==
- Price-to-earnings ratio
- Cash-flow-to-debt ratio
- Financial ratio
- Cash flow
