= Debtor days =

The debtors days ratio measures how quickly cash is being collected from debtors. The longer it takes for a company to collect, the greater the number of debtors days. Debtor days can also be referred to as debtor collection period. Another common ratio is the creditors days ratio.

== Definition ==
$\mbox{Debtor days} = \frac {\mbox{Year end trade debtors}} {\mbox{Sales}} \times {\mbox{Number of days in financial year}}$

or

$\mbox{Debtor days} = \frac {\mbox{Average trade debtors}} {\mbox{Sales}} \times {\mbox{Number of days in financial year}}$

when

$\mbox{Average trade debtors} = \frac {\mbox{Opening trade debtors} + \mbox{Closing trade debtors}} {\mbox{2}}$
