= Negative return (finance) =

Term in finance

In business and finance, a negative return is a situation in which an investment yields a loss—that is, when the net profit falls below the original capital invested. By extension the term is also applied to projects or initiatives deemed unproductive or not worthwhile, even when evaluated outside strictly economic criteria.
