= Return on capital employed =

Financial measure for comparing profitability

Return on capital employed is an accounting ratio used in finance, valuation, and accounting. It is a useful measure for comparing the relative profitability of companies after taking into account the amount of capital used.

== The formula ==
ROCE = (Earning Before Interest and Tax (EBIT))/(Capital Employed) (Expressed as a %)

It is similar to return on assets (ROA), but takes into account sources of financing.

=== Capital employed ===
In the denominator we have net assets or capital employed instead of total assets (which is the case of Return on Assets). Capital Employed has many definitions. In general it is the capital investment necessary for a business to function. It is commonly represented as total assets less current liabilities (or fixed assets plus working capital requirement).

ROCE uses the reported (period end) capital numbers; if one instead uses the average of the opening and closing capital for the period, one obtains return on average capital employed (ROACE).

== Application ==
ROCE is used to prove the value the business gains from its assets and liabilities. Companies create value whenever they are able to generate returns on capital above the weighted average cost of capital (WACC). A business which owns much land will have a smaller ROCE compared to a business which owns little land but makes the same profit.

It basically can be used to show how much a business is gaining for its assets, or how much it is losing for its liabilities.

=== Drawbacks ===
The main drawback of ROCE is that it measures return against the book value of assets in the business. As these are depreciated the ROCE will increase even though cash flow has remained the same. Thus, older businesses with depreciated assets will tend to have higher ROCE than newer, possibly better businesses. In addition, while cash flow is affected by inflation, the book value of assets is not. Consequently, revenues increase with inflation while capital employed generally does not (as the book value of assets is not affected by inflation).

== See also ==
- Cash-flow return on investment (CFROI)
- Cash surplus value added (CsVA) index
- Economic value added (EVA)
- Return on assets (ROA)
- Return on equity (ROE)
- Return on invested capital (ROIC)
