= Debt service coverage ratio =

Financial metric assessing ability to cover debt payments

The debt service coverage ratio (DSCR), also known as the debt coverage ratio (DCR), is a financial ratio that measures an entity's ability to generate sufficient cash to cover its debt obligations, including interest, principal, and lease payments. It is calculated by dividing the net operating income (NOI) by the total debt service. A higher DSCR indicates stronger cash flow relative to debt commitments, while a ratio below 1 suggests insufficient funds to meet payments. Lenders, such as banks, often set a minimum DSCR in loan covenants, where falling below this threshold may constitute a default.

In corporate finance, the DSCR reflects cash flow available for annual debt payments, including sinking fund contributions. In personal finance, it aids loan officers in evaluating an individual’s debt repayment capacity. In commercial real estate, it determines whether a property’s cash flow can sustain its debt, with typical minimums around 1.25.

== Applications ==
The DSCR serves distinct purposes across contexts. In corporate settings, it measures a company’s ability to service debt obligations from operating income, while in personal finance, it evaluates an individual's borrowing capacity. In real estate lending, DSCR is a critical indicator of a property’s income potential and loan eligibility. Traditionally, banks required a DSCR of around 1.20 or higher for investment properties, though some modern non-QM and investor-focused lenders may permit lower ratios under specific programs. A DSCR above 1.0 indicates that the property generates enough income to cover its debt service, while a ratio below 1.0 signals a potential shortfall. In project finance, a Debt Service Reserve Account (DSRA) may be used to offset temporary DSCR deficiencies.

== Calculation ==
In general, it is calculated by:

DSCR = (Net Operating Income)/(Debt Service)

where:

Net Operating Income = Adj. EBITDA = (Gross Operating Revenue) − (Operating Expenses)

Debt Service = (Principal Repayment) + (Interest Payments) + (Lease Payments)

To calculate an entity's debt coverage ratio, you first need to determine the entity's net operating income (NOI). NOI is the difference between gross revenue and operating expenses. NOI is meant to reflect the true income of an entity or an operation without or before financing. Thus, financing costs (e.g., interests from loans), personal income tax of owners/investors, capital expenditure, and depreciation are not included in operating expenses.

Debt service are costs and payments related to financing. Interests and lease payments are true costs resulting from taking loans or borrowing assets. Paying down the principal of a loan does not change the net equity/liquidation value of an entity; however, it reduces the cash an entity processes (in exchange of decreasing loan liability or increasing equity in an asset). Thus, by accounting for principal payments, DSCR reflects the cash flow situation of an entity.

For example, if a property has a debt coverage ratio of less than one, the income that property generates is not enough to cover the mortgage payments and the property's operating expenses. A property with a debt coverage ratio of .8 only generates enough income to pay for 80 percent of the yearly debt payments. However, if a property has a debt coverage ratio of more than 1, the property does generate enough income to cover annual debt payments. For example, a property with a debt coverage ratio of 1.5 generates enough income to pay all of the annual debt expenses, all of the operating expenses and actually generates fifty percent more income than is required to pay these bills.

In the commercial real estate industry, the minimum DSCR set by lenders is 1.25, meaning that the property's net operating income (NOI) is 25% greater than the annual debt service.

A DSCR of less than 1 would mean a negative cash flow. A DSCR of less than 1, say .95, would mean that there is only enough net operating income to cover 95% of annual debt payments. For example, in the context of personal finance, this would mean that the borrower would have to delve into his or her personal funds every month to keep the project afloat. Generally, lenders frown on a negative cash flow, but some allow it if the borrower has strong outside income.

Typically, most commercial banks require the ratio of 1.15–1.35 × (NOI/( annual debt service)) to ensure cash flow sufficient to cover loan payments is available on an ongoing basis.

=== Example ===
Let's say Mr. Jones is looking at an investment property with a net operating income of $36,000 and an annual debt service of $30,000. The debt coverage ratio for this property would be 1.2 and Mr. Jones would know the property generates 20 percent more than is required to pay the annual mortgage payment.

The debt service coverage ratio is also typically used to evaluate the quality of a portfolio of mortgages. For example, on June 19, 2008, a popular US rating agency, Standard & Poors, reported that it lowered its credit rating on several classes of pooled commercial mortgage pass-through certificates originally issued by Bank of America. The rating agency stated in a press release that it had lowered the credit ratings of four certificates in the Bank of America Commercial Mortgage Inc. 2005–1 series, stating that the downgrades "reflect the credit deterioration of the pool". They further go on to state that this downgrade resulted from the fact that eight specific loans in the pool have a debt service coverage (DSC) below 1.0x, or below one times.

The debt service coverage ratio provides a useful indicator of financial strength. Standard & Poors reported that the total pool consisted, as of June 10, 2008, of 135 loans, with an aggregate trust balance of $2.052 billion. They indicate that there were, as of that date, eight loans with a DSC of lower than 1.0x. This means that the net funds coming in from rental of the commercial properties are not covering the mortgage costs. Now, since no one would make a loan like this initially, a financial analyst or informed investor will seek information on what the rate of deterioration of the DSC has been. You want to know not just what the DSC is at a particular point in time, but also how much it has changed from when the loan was last evaluated. The S&P press release tells us this. It indicates that of the eight loans which are "underwater", they have an average balance of $10.1 million, and an average decline in DSC of 38% since the loans were issued.

And there is still more. Since there are a total of 135 loans in the pool, and only eight of them are underwater, with a DSC of less than 1, the obvious question is: what is the total DSC of the entire pool of 135 loans? The Standard and Poors press release provides this number, indicating that the weighted average DSC for the entire pool is 1.76 ×. Again, this is just a snapshot now. The key question that DSC can help you answer, is this better or worse, from when all the loans in the pool were first made? The S&P press release provides this also, explaining that the original weighted average DSC for the entire pool of 135 loans was 1.66 ×.

In this way, the DSC (debt service coverage) ratio provides a way to assess the financial quality, and the associated risk level, of this pool of loans, and shows the surprising result that despite some loans experiencing DSC below 1, the overall DSC of the entire pool has improved, from 1.66 × to 1.76 ×. This is pretty much what a good loan portfolio should look like, with DSC improving over time, as the loans are paid down, and a small percentage, in this case 6%, experiencing DSC ratios below one times, suggesting that for these loans, there may be trouble ahead.

And of course, just because the DSCR is less than 1 for some loans, this does not necessarily mean they will default.

=== Pre-Tax Provision Method ===
Income taxes present a special problem to DSCR calculation and interpretation. While, in concept, DSCR is the ratio of cash flow available for debt service to required debt service, in practice – because interest is a tax-deductible expense and principal is not – there is no one figure that represents an amount of cash generated from operations that is both fully available for debt service and the only cash available for debt service.

While Earnings Before Interest, Taxes, Depreciation and Amortization (EBITDA) is an appropriate measure of a company's ability to make interest-only payments (assuming that expected change in working capital is zero), EBIDA (without the "T") is a more appropriate indicator of a company's ability to make required principal payments. Ignoring these distinctions can lead to DSCR values that overstate or understate a company's debt service capacity. The Pre-Tax Provision Method provides a single ratio that expresses overall debt service capacity reliably given these challenges.

Debt Service Coverage Ratio as calculated using the Pre-Tax Provision Method answers the following question: How many times greater was the company's EBITDA than its critical EBITDA value, where critical EBITDA is that which just covers its

Interest obligations + Principal obligations + Tax Expense assuming minimum sufficient income + Other necessary expenditures not treated as accounting expenses, like dividends and CAPEX.

The DSCR calculation under the Pre-Tax Provision Method is

EBITDA/((Interest) + (Pre-tax Provision for Post-Tax Outlays)),

where Pre-tax Provision for Post-tax Outlays is the amount of pretax cash that must be set aside to meet required post-tax outlays, i.e.,

CPLTD + (Unfinanced CAPEX) + Dividends.

The provision can be calculated as follows:

If (noncash expenses depreciation) + (depletion) + (amortization) > (post-tax outlays), then

(Pretax provision for post-tax outlays) = (Post-tax outlays)

For example, if a company's post-tax outlays consist of CPLTD of $90M and $10M in unfinanced CAPEX, and its noncash expenses are $100M, then the company can apply $100M of cash inflow from operations to post-tax outlays without paying taxes on that $100M cash inflow. In this case, the pretax cash that the borrower must set aside for post-tax outlays would simply be $100M.

If (post-tax outlays) > (noncash expenses), then

(Pretax provision for post-tax outlays) = (Noncash expenses) + ((post-tax outlays) − (noncash expenses))/( 1 − (income tax rate))

For example, if post-tax outlays consist of CPLTD of $100M and noncash expenses are $50M, then the borrower can apply $50M of cash inflow from operations directly against $50M of post-tax outlays without paying taxes on that $50M inflow, but the company must set aside $77M (assuming a 35% income tax rate) to meet the remaining $50M of post-tax outlays. This company's pretax provision for post-tax outlays = $50M + $77M = $127M.

== See also ==
- Loan life coverage ratio
- Operating leverage
- Project finance
- Cash-flow-to-debt ratio
