= Profit margin =

Ratio between turnover and profit

Profit margin is a financial ratio that measures the percentage of profit earned by a company in relation to its revenue. Expressed as a percentage, it indicates how much profit the company makes for every dollar of revenue generated. Profit margin is important because this percentage provides a comprehensive picture of the operating efficiency of a business or an industry. All margin changes provide useful indicators for assessing growth potential, investment viability and the financial stability of a company relative to its competitors. Maintaining a healthy profit margin will help to ensure the financial success of a business, which will improve its ability to obtain loans.

It is calculated by finding the profit as a percentage of the revenue.

$$\text{Profit Margin} = {100 \cdot \text{Profit}\over\text{Revenue}} = {{100 \cdot (\text{Sales} - \text{Total Expenses})}\over\text{Revenue}}$$
For example, if a company reports that it achieved a 35% profit margin during the last quarter, it means that it netted $0.35 from each dollar of sales generated.

Profit margins are generally distinct from rate of return. Profit margins can include risk premiums and monopoly profits.

== Overview ==
Profit margin is calculated with selling price (or revenue) taken as base times 100. It is the percentage of selling price that is turned into profit, whereas "profit percentage" or "markup" is the percentage of cost price that one gets as profit on top of cost price. While selling something one should know what percentage of profit one will get on a particular investment, so companies calculate profit percentage to find the ratio of profit to cost.

The profit margin is used mostly for internal comparison. It is difficult to accurately compare the net profit ratio for different entities. Individual businesses' operating and financing arrangements vary so much that different entities are bound to have different levels of expenditure, so that comparison of one with another can have little meaning. A low profit margin indicates a low margin of safety: higher risk that a decline in sales will erase profits and result in a net loss, or a negative margin.

Profit margin is an indicator of a company's pricing strategies and how well it controls costs. Differences in competitive strategy and product mix cause the profit margin to vary among different companies.

- If an investor makes $10 revenue and it cost them $1 to earn it, when they take their cost away they are left with 90% margin. They made 900% profit on their $1 investment.
- If an investor makes $10 revenue and it cost them $5 to earn it, when they take their cost away they are left with 50% margin. They made 100% profit on their $5 investment.
- If an investor makes $10 revenue and it cost them $9 to earn it, when they take their cost away they are left with 10% margin. They made 11.11% profit on their $9 investment.

== Profit percentage ==
On the other hand, profit percentage is calculated with cost taken as base:
$$\text{Profit Percentage} = {100 \cdot \text{Net Profit}\over\text{Cost}}$$

Suppose that something is bought for $40 and sold for $100.

Cost = $40
Revenue = $100
$$\text{Profit} = \$100 - \$40 = \$60$$
$$\text{Profit percentage} = \frac{100 \times \$60} {\$40} = 150\%$$
$$\text{Profit margin} = \frac{100 \times (\$100 - \$40)} {\$100} = 60\%$$
$\text{Return on investment multiple} = \frac{\$60} {\$40} = 1.5$ (profit divided by cost).

If the revenue is the same as the cost, profit percentage is 0%. The result above or below 100% can be calculated as the percentage of return on investment. In this example, the return on investment is a multiple of 1.5 of the investment, corresponding to a 150% gain.

== Type of profit margin ==
There are three types of profit margins: gross profit margin, operating profit margin and net profit margin.

=== Gross profit margin ===
Gross profit margin is calculated as gross profit divided by net sales (percentage). Gross profit is calculated by deducting the cost of goods sold (COGS)—that is, all the direct costs—from the revenue. This margin compares revenue to variable cost. Service companies, such as law firms, can use the cost of revenue (the total cost to achieve a sale) instead of the cost of goods sold (COGS). It is calculated as:
$$\text{Gross Profit} = \text{Revenue} - (\text{Direct materials} + \text{Direct labor} + \text{Factory overhead})$$
$$\text{Net Sales} = \text{Revenue} - \text{Cost of Sales Returns} - \text{Allowances and Discounts}$$
$$\text{Gross Profit Margin} = {100 \cdot \text{Gross Profit}\over\text{Net Sales}}$$

Example. If a company takes in a revenue of $1,000,000 and $600,000 in COGS. Gross profit is $400,000, and gross profit margin is (400,000 / 1,000,000) x 100 = 40%.

=== Operating profit margin ===
Operating profit margin includes the cost of goods sold and is the earning before interest and taxes (EBIT) known as operating income divided by revenue. The COGS formula is the same across most industries, but what is included in each of the elements can vary for each. It should be calculated as:
$$\text{Operating Profit Margin} = {100 \cdot \text{Operating Income}\over\text{Revenue}}$$

Example. If a company has $1,000,000 in revenue, $600,000 in COGS, and $200,000 in operating expenses. Operating profit is $200,000, and operating profit margin is (200,000 / 1,000,000) x 100 = 20%.

=== Net profit margin ===
Net profit margin is net profit divided by revenue. Net profit is calculated as revenue minus all expenses from total sales.
$$\text{Net Profit Margin} = {100 \cdot \text{Net profit}\over\text{Revenue}}$$

Example. A company has $1,000,000 in revenue, $600,000 in COGS, $200,000 in operating expenses, and $50,000 in taxes. Net profit is $150,000, and net profit margin is (150,000 / 1,000,000) x 100 = 15%.

== Importance of profit margin ==
Profit margin in an economy reflects the profitability of any business and enables relative comparisons between small and large businesses. It is a standard measure to evaluate the potential and capacity of a business in generating profits. These margins help business determine their pricing strategies for goods and services. The pricing is influenced by the cost of their products and the expected profit margin. Pricing errors which create cash flow challenges can be detected using profit margin concept and prevent potential challenges and losses in an entity.

Profit margin is also used by businesses and companies to study the seasonal patterns and changes in the performance and further detect operational challenges. For example, a negative or zero profit margin indicates that the sales of a business does not suffice or it is failing to manage its expenses. This encourages business owners to identify the areas which inhibit growth such as inventory accumulation, under-utilized resources or high cost of production.

Profit margins are important whilst seeking credit and is often used as collateral. They are important to investors who base their predictions on many factors, one of which is the profit margin. It is used to compare between companies and influences the decision of investment in a particular venture. To attract investors, a high profit margin is preferred while comparing with similar businesses.

== Uses of profit margin in business ==
Profit margins can be used to assess a company's financial performance over time. By comparing profit margins over time, investors and analysts can assess whether a company's profitability is improving or deteriorating. This information can be used to make informed investment decisions.

Profit margins are a useful tool for comparing the profitability of different companies in the same industry. By comparing the profitability of similar companies, investors can determine which companies are more profitable and therefore potentially more attractive investment opportunities. Low profit margins can act as a warning to a company's owners and directors that the company might be in distress or the goods are being sold too cheap: "whatever the reason, low margins could signal trouble in the long run".

Profit margins can also be used to assess a company's pricing strategy. By analysing the profitability of different products and services, companies can determine which products or services are most profitable and adjust their pricing accordingly. This can help companies maximise profitability and remain competitive in the marketplace.

Margins can also be used to identify areas of a company's operations that may be inefficient or not cost effective. By analysing the profitability of different product lines, companies can identify areas where costs are too high in relation to the profits generated. This information can then be used to optimise operations and reduce costs.

In some cases, companies may agree to cover profit margin shortfalls as part of a business-to-business supply contract, such as an agreement between a retailer and a supplier. However, in the UK, a Groceries Code Adjudicator report published in 2015 found that requirements to cover margin shortfalls imposed on suppliers by supermarket chains, where they had not been contractual agreed, were seen as a "relatively common" problem among suppliers.

== By sector ==
Estimated average after-tax unadjusted operating margin in the US by market sector as of January 2024:

Sector	After-tax unadjusted operating margin in %
Advertising	9.1
Aerospace & Defense	7.9
Air Transport	6.3
Apparel	7.9
Auto & Truck	4.7
Auto Parts	4.5
Banks (Money Center)	0.0
Banks (Regional)	0.0
Beverage (Alcoholic)	18.5
Beverage (Soft)	18.0
Broadcasting	10.8
Brokerage & Investment Banking	0.6
Building Materials	10.8
Business & Consumer Services	9.9
Cable TV	14.8
Chemical (Basic)	7.2
Chemical (Diversified)	1.3
Chemical (Specialty)	11.7
Coal & Related Energy	20.0
Computer Services	6.4
Computers & Peripherals	19.2
Construction Supplies	12.9
Diversified	21.7
Drugs (Biotechnology)	1.1
Drugs (Pharmaceutical)	17.6
Education	5.2
Electrical Equipment	8.5
Electronics (Consumer & Office)	-0.1
Electronics (General)	8.7
Engineering & Construction	3.8
Entertainment	6.8
Environmental & Waste Services	12.8
Farming & Agriculture	9.5
Financial Services (Non-bank & Insurance)	13.5
Food Processing	9.9
Food Wholesalers	1.9
Home Furnishings	5.0
Green & Renewable Energy	22.4
Healthcare Products	12.6
Healthcare Support Services	3.6
Healthcare Information and Technology	13.6
Homebuilding	13.4
Hospitals & Healthcare Facilities	10.8
Hotel, Gaming & Gambling	15.7
Household Products	15.5
Information Services	9.8
Insurance (General)	13.1
Insurance (Life)	0.1
Insurance (Property & Casualty)	6.5
Investments & Asset Management	13.3
Machinery	13.0
Metals & Mining	19.2
Office Equipment & Services	6.0
Oil & Gas (Integrated)	12.3
Oil & Gas (Production and Exploration)	35.2
Oil & Gas (Distribution)	34.4
Oilfield Services & Equipment	7.8
Packaging & Container	8.0
Paper & Forest Products	8.7
Power	14.1
Precious Metals	9.3
Publishing & Newspapers	7.0
Real estate investment trust (REIT)	23.9
Real estate development	12.4
Real Estate (General & Diversified)	14.0
Real Estate (Operations & Services)	-0.3
Recreation	8.9
Reinsurance	7.4
Restaurant & Dining	14.0
Retail (Automotive)	5.3
Retail (Building Supply)	10.9
Retail (Distributors)	10.1
Retail (General)	3.8
Retail (Grocery and Food)	2.0
Retail (REIT)	35.8
Retail (Special Lines)	4.2
Rubber & Tires	1.8
Semiconductor	18.8
Semiconductor Equipment	21.2
Shipbuilding & Marine	9.9
Shoe	10.8
Software (Entertainment)	25.4
Software (Internet)	-3.3
Software (System & Application)	24.2
Steel	10.2
Telecommunications (Wireless)	15.2
Telecommunications Equipment	18.4
Telecommunications Services	19.5
Tobacco	36.8
Transportation	7.4
Transportation (Railroads)	29.0
Trucking	6.8
Public utility (General)	18.7
Public utility (Water)	27.4

== See also ==
- Competition law
- Earnings before interest and taxes
- Earnings before interest, taxes, depreciation, and amortization
- Excess profits tax
- Gross profit margin
- Monopoly
- Monopoly price
- Net income
- Operating profit margin
- Return on capital
- Windfall gain
- Windfall tax
