= Return on net assets =

The return on net assets (RONA) is a measure of financial performance of a company which takes the use of assets into account. Higher RONA means that the company is using its assets and working capital efficiently and effectively. RONA is used by investors to determine how well management is utilizing assets.

== Basic formulae ==
Return on net assets = (net income)/( (Fixed assets) + (working capital))

where

Working capital = (current assets) − (current liabilities)

In a manufacturing sector, this is also calculated as:

Return on net assets = ((plant revenue) − costs)/( (net assets))

== Use and interpretation ==
Return on net assets is used to assess how efficiently a company generates profit from fixed assets and net working capital. Because the denominator focuses on operating assets rather than total assets, RONA is often used to evaluate asset-intensive businesses where plant, equipment, and working capital are important drivers of operating performance.

A higher RONA generally indicates that a company is generating more profit from the assets employed in the business. However, the ratio is most useful when compared with prior periods or with companies in the same industry, because asset intensity, depreciation policies, and working-capital requirements can differ substantially across sectors.

== See also ==
- Financial ratio
