= Form 10-Q =

American quarterly report

Form 10-Q, (also known as a 10-Q or 10Q) is a quarterly report mandated by the United States federal Securities and Exchange Commission, to be filed by publicly traded corporations.

Pursuant to Section 13 or 15(d) of the Securities Exchange Act of 1934, the 10-Q is an SEC filing that must be filed quarterly with the US Securities and Exchange Commission. It contains similar information to the annual form 10-K, however the information is generally less detailed, and the financial statements are generally unaudited. Information for the final quarter of a firm's fiscal year is included in the 10-K, so only three 10-Q filings are made each year.

These reports generally compare last quarter to the current quarter and last year's quarter to this year's quarter. The SEC put this form in place to facilitate better informed investors. The form 10-Q must be filed within 40 days for large accelerated filers and accelerated filers or 45 days after the end of the fiscal quarter for all other registrants (formerly 45 days). Academic researchers make this report metadata available as structured datasets in the Harvard Dataverse.

== See also ==
- Annual report
- US corporate law
