= Return on equity =

Measure of the profitability of a business

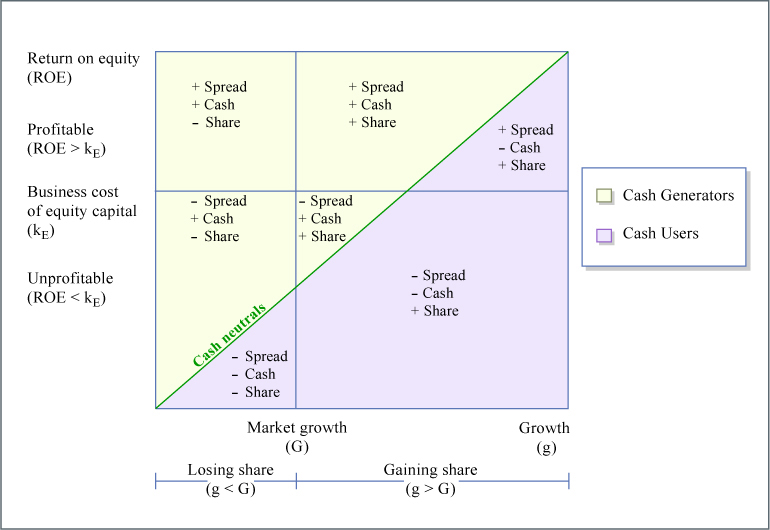
The profitability matrix.

The return on equity (ROE) is a measure of the profitability of a business in relation to its equity; where:

ROE = (Net Income)/(Average Shareholders' Equity)

Thus, ROE is equal to a fiscal year's net income (after preferred stock dividends, before common stock dividends), divided by total equity (excluding preferred shares), expressed as a percentage. Because shareholder's equity can be calculated by taking all assets and subtracting all liabilities, ROE can also be thought of as a return on NAV, or assets less liabilities.

== Usage ==
ROE measures how many dollars of profit are generated for each dollar of shareholder's equity, and is thus a metric of how well the company utilizes its equity to generate profits.

ROE is especially used for comparing the performance of companies in the same industry. As with return on capital, an ROE is a measure of management's ability to generate income from the equity available to it. ROEs of 15–20% are generally considered good.

ROE is also a factor in stock valuation, in association with other financial ratios. Note though that, while higher ROE ought intuitively to imply higher stock prices, in reality, predicting the stock value of a company based on its ROE is dependent on too many other factors to be of use by itself.

Both of these are expanded below.

== The DuPont formula ==
The DuPont formula, also known as the strategic profit model, is a framework allowing management to decompose ROE into three actionable components; these "drivers of value" being the efficiency of operations, asset usage, and finance. ROE is then the net profit margin multiplied by asset turnover multiplied by accounting leverage:

$$\mathrm{ROE} = \frac{\mbox{Net income}}{\mbox{Sales}}\times\frac{\mbox{Sales}}{\mbox{Total Assets}}\times\frac{\mbox{Total Assets}}{\mbox{Shareholder Equity}}$$

The application, in the main, is either to financial management or to fund management:

- Splitting return on equity into the three components, makes it easier for financial managers to understand changes in ROE over time. For example, if the net margin increases, every sale brings in more money, resulting in a higher overall ROE. Similarly, if the asset turnover increases, the firm generates more sales for every unit of assets owned, again resulting in a higher overall ROE. Finally, increasing accounting leverage means that the firm uses more debt financing relative to equity financing. Interest payments to creditors are tax-deductible, but dividend payments to shareholders are not. Thus, a higher proportion of debt in the firm's capital structure leads to higher ROE. Financial leverage benefits diminish as the risk of defaulting on interest payments increases. If the firm takes on too much debt, the cost of debt rises as creditors demand a higher risk premium, and ROE decreases. Increased debt will make a positive contribution to a firm's ROE only if the matching return on assets (ROA) of that debt exceeds the interest rate on the debt.
- Identifying the sources of ROE in this fashion similarly allows investment analysts a better knowledge of the company and how it should be valued. Here, analysts will compare the current sources of ROE against the company's history and its competitors, and thereby better understand the drivers of value. In particular, as mentioned, ROE is used developing estimates of a stock’s growth rate, and hence the growth rate of its dividends. These then feed, respectively, into the terminal value calculation, and / or the dividend discount model valuation result. Relatedly, within the listed corporate, this analysis allows management to preempt any underperformance vs shareholders' required return, which could then lead to a decline in the company's shares value, since, "in order to satisfy investors, a company should be able to generate a higher ROE than the return available from a lower risk investment".

== See also ==
- List of business and finance abbreviations
- Return on assets (RoA)
- Return on brand (ROB)
- Return on capital employed (ROCE)
- Return on capital (RoC)
- Return on net assets (RoNA)
- Leverage (finance)
