= Ex-dividend date =

Investment term involving the timing of dividend payments

The ex-dividend date is an investment term involving the timing of payment of dividends on stocks of corporations, income trusts, and other financial holdings, both publicly and privately held. It coincides with the reinvestment date for shares held subject to a dividend reinvestment plan. The ex-date or ex-dividend date or ex-div day represents the date on or after which a security is traded without a previously declared dividend or distribution. The opening price on the ex-dividend date, in comparison to the previous closing price, can be expected to decrease by the amount of the dividend, although this change may be obscured by other influences on the stock's value.

A person purchasing a stock before its ex-dividend date, and holding the position before the market opens on the ex-dividend date, is by convention entitled to the dividend. A person purchasing a stock on its ex-dividend date or after will not receive the current dividend payment. The time period before ex-dividend date, on which the register of shareholders is not changed and read for dividend payment, is called book closure.

As far as the company registrar is concerned, to determine the ultimate eligibility for a dividend or distribution, the record date, not the ex-date, is relevant. Each shareholder entered in the shareholders' register at the record date is entitled to a dividend. Usually, the person owning the stock at the end of the trading day one business day before the ex-date is also the person registered in the shareholders register on the record date, because companies set the ex-date and record date of the dividend in line with the settlement cycle of the security.

However if, for whatever reason, a share transfer prior to the ex-dividend date is not recorded on the register in time, the seller will receive the dividend from the company but is then obligated to pay the dividend to the buyer.

Most developed financial markets such as the US, UK, Germany, France, etc. use a settlement cycle of T+2 for stocks. (US is now T+1 as described below.) As a result, companies in these markets set the ex-date one business day before the record date of the dividend (example: ex-date Wednesday, record date Thursday: a security purchased on Tuesday will settle on Thursday; a person who bought the security on Tuesday bought one day before the ex-date and will be registered as shareholder on Thursday and hence be entitled to the dividend).

== Background ==
Many publicly traded companies, and some privately held ones, pay dividends on their stock. Stock shares trade fluidly on public markets, so the ownership of the shares may change at the end of each trading day, and any given share may have a series of different owners over time. When declaring a dividend, a company will designate a record date for the dividend. The practical rules of the financial system determine precisely which of the owners will be entitled to receive the dividend payment: namely the owner of record, who owned the share(s) at the end of the trading day on the record date. The company thus resolves payment to the share owner identified on the company's share register as of the record date. Since the process of settlement involves some days of delay, stock exchanges set an earlier date, known as the ex-dividend date (typically the business day prior to the record date) to synchronize the time for this processing. Thus the key date for a stock purchase is the ex-dividend date: a purchase on that date (or after) will be ex (outside, without right to) the dividend.

If, for whatever reason, a share transfer prior to the ex-dividend date is not recorded on the register in time, the seller is obligated to repay the dividend to the buyer when he receives it.

In the United States, the IRS defines the ex-dividend date thus: "The ex-dividend date is the first date following the declaration of a dividend on which the purchaser of a stock is not entitled to receive the next dividend payment." The London Stock Exchange defines the term "ex" as "when a stock or dividend is issued by a company it is based upon an 'on register' or 'record date'. However, to create a level playing field when shares are traded on the London Stock Exchange during this benefit period an 'ex' date is set. Before this 'ex' date if shares are sold the selling party will need to pass on the benefit or dividend to the buying party."

== Adjustment of standing orders ==
On some markets, after the close of business on the day before the ex-dividend date and before the market opens on the ex-dividend date, all open good-until-canceled limit, stop, and stop limit orders are automatically reduced by the amount of the dividend, except for orders that the customer indicated "do not reduce." This is done because the dividend payout will decrease the value of the company, as it comes directly from the company's reserves. At the market opening on the ex-dividend date, the stock will trade at a lower price, adjusted for the amount of the dividend paid. If a corporation is distributing something other than a cash dividend, such as rights or warrants, then the relevant date is called an ex rights date, or ex warrants date, etc.

== United States ==
In the United States, the Securities and Exchange Commission (SEC) stipulates the T+1 rule, that stock trades settle one business day after purchase. That time period was last shortened on May 28, 2024. The ex-dividend date is normally the same day as the record date. For the purpose of calculating an ex-dividend date, business days are days on which both the major stock exchanges and the banks in New York State are open. Thus Columbus Day and Veterans Day are trading days, but not business days for calculating an ex-dividend date, since they are legal holidays and banks are not open.

If the record date is not a business day, then counting begins from the most recent business day instead of the actual record date. For instance, if the record date is Sunday, then the ex-dividend date is the preceding Thursday, not Friday — assuming no intervening holidays.

To be a stockholder on the record date, an investor must purchase the stock before the ex-dividend date in order to allow for the 1-trading day settlement of the stock purchase. If the investor purchases the stock the day before the ex-dividend date the investor would be a stockholder on the record date and would be entitled to receive the dividend payment.

An investor only needs to own the stock for one day (the record date) to be entitled to receive the dividend payment. If the investor buys before the ex-dividend date, and sells on the ex-dividend date or after, the investor will receive the dividend payment. More precisely, the owner at the close of trading on the record date receives the dividend, since shares may be traded frequently and have a series of owners on any given single day.

=== Tax consequences ===
The ex-dividend date is also a factor in computing U.S. taxes that depend on holding periods. To receive favorable personal income tax rates on qualified dividends of a common stock, the stock must be held continuously for over 60 calendar days within the window of 121 calendar days centered on the ex-dividend date. Otherwise the dividend income is taxed at higher rates for ordinary income.

The ex-dividend date does not determine the tax year of the dividend income. The tax year of a dividend is determined by the payment date, which is typically a week or more after the ex-dividend date. However, if a mutual fund or real estate investment trust (REIT) declares a dividend in October, November, or December that is payable to shareholders of record on a date in one of those months but actually pays the dividend during January of the next calendar year, the dividend is considered to have been received for tax purposes on December 31 of the year it was declared.

=== Exceptions ===
Large distributions such as special dividends or stock splits involve different ex-dividend timing formulas than for regular dividends. For example, the Nasdaq market provides a different ex-dividend timing when distributions are 25 percent or more of a security's value.

Market regulators occasionally change the supervisory rules governing market trading, with the consequence of changing the ex-dividend date formulas. For example, in September 2017 the SEC shortened the T+3 rule to T+2 in U.S. securities markets, resulting in subsequent ex-dividend dates being a day later than they would have been before the change. The SEC again shortened the settlement period to T+1 effective May 2024. Since such a rule transition creates a day with a possible confusion of which rule applies, companies are notified well in advance of the transition, and are directed to simply avoid choosing that specific day for paying dividends. Investors concerned with details of ex-dividend dates must also be aware of such rare changes to the trading system.

== United Kingdom ==
For shares listed on the London Stock Exchange, the ex-dividend date is usually one business day before the record date. The ex-dividend date is almost always on a Thursday, and the associated record date is the Friday immediately following. Exceptions to this timetable are usually special dividends, and dividends provided by overseas issuers who only have a secondary listing on the London Stock Exchange. Before 9 October 2014, the ex-dividend date was usually two business days before the record date, i.e. typically Wednesdays.

== See also ==
- Dividend tax
- Dividend units
- Dividend yield
- Dividend
- Dividend cover
- Dividend reinvestment plan or DRIP
- Liquidating dividend
- Stock buyback
