= Special dividend =

Dividend paid by a company out of schedule

A special dividend is a payment made by a company to its shareholders, that the company declares to be separate from the typical recurring dividend cycle, if any, for the company.

Usually when a company raises the amount of its normal dividend, the investor expectation is that this marks a sustained increase. In the case of a special dividend, however, the company is signalling that this is a one-off payment. Therefore, special dividends do not markedly affect valuation or yield calculations, unless the amount is large—in which case they do markedly affect valuation as they are a direct and large depletion of the assets of the company. Typically, special dividends are distributed if a company has exceptionally strong earnings that it wishes to distribute to shareholders, or if it is making changes to its financial structure, such as debt ratio.

A prominent example of a special dividend was the $3 dividend announced by Microsoft in 2004, to partially relieve its balance sheet of a large cash balance. A more recent example of a special dividend is the $1 dividend announced by SAIC (U.S. company) in 2013, just prior to it splitting off its solutions business into a new company named Leidos. Subsequently, in 2020 NortonLifeLock Inc (NASDAQ: NLOK) paid a $12/share special dividend as part of its goal to return the after-tax proceeds from the sale of its Enterprise Security assets to Broadcom.

== Payment date ==
For special dividends, the ex-dividend date is set according to the size of the dividend in relation to the price of the security, and dividends or distributions of less than 25% are subject to the 'regular' rules for ex-dividend dates.

However, dividends or distributions of more than 25% are subject to 'special' rules for ex-dividend dates. The major difference here is that for these larger distributions or dividends, the ex-dividend date is set as the day after payment (with the day of payment being the "payment date").

For these larger 'special dividends', the ex-dividend date is generally one stock trading day after the dividend payment date. The dividend payment date occurs sometime after the dividend record date. The stock will trade on an ex-distribution basis (adjusted for the amount of the dividend paid) on the trading day after the dividend payment date, and thereafter.

To be entitled to a special dividend of less than 25% of the share price, you need to be a stockholder on the record date. To be a stockholder on the record date, your purchase would need to have been made a minimum of two business days prior to the record date, and you would still have to own it on that day. The ex-dividend date, i.e. the first date in which a new buyer of shares would not be entitled to the dividend, is the business day prior to the record date (see ex-dividend date for exceptions).

In the case of a special dividend of 25% or more, however, special rules that are quite different apply. If you sell stock after the record date but before the ex-dividend date, your shares will be sold with a book entry sometimes called a "due bill", which denotes that (though the company will pay the dividend to your account, if you are the shareholder of record on the date two business days prior to the record date), your account must, in turn, turn the amount of that dividend over to the buyer of your stock. Conversely, if you buy stock after the record date but before the ex-dividend date of a large special dividend, you are entitled to the dividend and will receive it via the due bill process.

As is the case with all dividends, if you sell your stock prior to the ex-dividend date, within the due bill period, you relinquish your right to the dividend. The earliest you can sell your stock and still be entitled to the special dividend is the date the stock begins trading on an ex-distribution basis, or generally one day after the dividend payment date, on the ex-dividend date.

In simplest terms, ownership on the "record date" usually, but not always (because of the case of large special dividends), determines who is entitled to a dividend. The ex-dividend date always identifies who is ultimately entitled to receive a dividend.

== Relationship to stock option contracts ==
Special dividends are different from regular cash dividends in that only the former cause strike prices to be adjusted on option contracts. This is because special dividends are not expected, and therefore would result in an unexpected transfer of wealth from those owning call options to those who sold them (vice versa for put options).

For example, say XYZ is priced at $40 today, and has a special dividend of $1. Since call option holders are not entitled to dividends, a holder of an option to buy stock XYZ at $30 will not receive the $1 special dividend. However, after paying the cash dividend, then (all else being equal) XYZ will drop to $39, as it has paid out $1 of its value. However, the option to buy a $39 stock at $30 is worth less than the option to buy a $40 stock at $30. Therefore, option exchanges have formulas to adjust contracts appropriately when special dividends are paid out. In this case, the call option to buy at $30 will be converted to a call option to buy at $29, which will keep the option value roughly the same.

Regular cash dividends do not result in such option contract adjustments. This is because the market expects them to occur, and they are therefore priced into the option premium. In a way, the buyer of a call option for a stock that pays a regular cash dividend gets a "buyer's discount".

== Types of special dividends ==
=== Cash dividends ===
Cash special dividends are the most prevalent form of extraordinary dividend distribution, accounting for approximately 85% of all special dividend payments in the US. These dividends provide shareholders with immediate liquidity through direct cash payments, typically funded by excess cash reserves, proceeds from asset sales, or extraordinary profits. Unlike regular quarterly dividends, cash special dividends are generally larger in magnitude and occur infrequently, with amounts often ranging from 5% to 50% of the company's stock price.

The distribution process follows standard dividend mechanics, with the company's board of directors declaring the dividend amount, establishing record date and payment dates, and executing the payment through transfer agents. Cash special dividends are subject to immediate taxation for shareholders in most jurisdictions, with tax treatment varying based on the dividend's classification as qualified dividend or non-qualified income.

=== Stock dividends ===
Stock special dividends involve the issuance of additional shares to existing shareholders as an alternative to cash distribution. This form of special dividend allows companies to reward shareholders while preserving cash for operational needs or strategic investments. The distribution ratio is typically expressed as a percentage of existing holdings, such as a 10% stock dividend providing one additional share for every ten shares owned.

Stock special dividends do not immediately provide shareholders with cash but increase their proportional ownership in the company. The market price per share generally adjusts downward proportionally to reflect the increased share count, maintaining the aggregate market value of shareholders' holdings. From an accounting perspective, stock dividends result in a transfer from retained earnings to paid-in capital without affecting total shareholders' equity.

=== Property dividends ===
Property special dividends involve the distribution of non-cash assets, securities, or subsidiary shares to shareholders. This category encompasses spin-off transactions where companies distribute shares of a subsidiary to create independent publicly traded entities. Property dividends may also include physical assets, real estate holdings, or securities of other companies held as investments.

The valuation of property dividends presents unique challenges, as the fair market value of distributed assets must be determined at the distribution date. Recipients typically receive fractional interests based on their shareholding percentage, with smaller shareholders sometimes receiving cash in lieu of fractional property interests. Property dividends often occur during corporate restructuring activities or when companies seek to unlock value from non-core assets.

=== Liquidating dividends ===
Liquidating special dividends represent distributions that exceed a company's current and accumulated earnings, effectively returning invested capital to shareholders. These dividends typically occur during partial or complete business liquidation, major asset sales, or corporate dissolution proceedings. Unlike regular dividends paid from earnings, liquidating dividends are considered a return of capital investment rather than income distribution.

The tax treatment of liquidating dividends differs significantly from ordinary dividends, as recipients generally treat the distribution as a reduction in their stock basis rather than taxable income. When the liquidating dividend exceeds the shareholder's basis in the stock, the excess is typically treated as capital gain. Companies must properly classify and report liquidating dividends to ensure shareholders receive appropriate tax documentation for accurate reporting.

== See also ==
- Dividend
- Dividend cover
- Dividend tax
- Dividend units
- Dividend yield
- Dividend reinvestment plan or DRIP
- Liquidating dividend
- Stock buyback
