= Dividend payout ratio =

Fraction of net income a firm pays to its stockholders in dividends

The dividend payout ratio is the fraction of net income a firm pays to its stockholders in dividends:

$$\mbox{Dividend payout ratio}=\frac{\mbox{Dividends}}{\mbox{Net Income for the same period}}$$

The part of earnings not paid to investors is left for investment to provide for future earnings growth. Investors seeking high current income and limited capital growth prefer companies with a high dividend payout ratio. However, investors seeking capital growth may prefer a lower payout ratio because capital gains are taxed at a lower rate. High growth firms in early life generally have low or zero payout ratios. As they mature, they tend to return more of the earnings back to investors. The dividend payout ratio is calculated as DPS/EPS.

According to Financial Accounting by Walter T. Harrison, the calculation for the payout ratio is as follows:

Payout Ratio = (Dividends - Preferred Stock Dividends)/Net Income

The dividend yield is given by earnings yield times the dividend payout ratio:

$$\begin{array}{lcl}
\mbox{Current Dividend Yield} & = & \frac{\mbox{Most Recent Full-Year Dividend}}{\mbox{Current Share Price}}     \\
& = & \frac{\mbox{Dividend payout ratio}\times \mbox{Most Recent Full-Year earnings per share}}{\mbox{Current Share Price}} \\
\end{array}$$

Conversely, the P/E ratio is the Price/Dividend ratio times the DPR.

== Impact of buybacks ==
Some companies choose stock buybacks as an alternative to dividends; in such cases this ratio becomes less meaningful. One way to adapt it using an augmented payout ratio:

Augmented Payout Ratio = (Dividends + Buybacks)/ Net Income for the same period

== Historic data ==
The data for S&P 500 is taken from a 2006 Eaton Vance post. The payout rate has gradually declined from 90% of operating earnings in 1940s to about 30% in recent years.

| Decade | Price % Change | Dividend Contribution | Total Return | Dividends as % of Total Return | Average Payout |
|---|---|---|---|---|---|
| 1930s | -41.90% | 56.00% | 14.10% | N/A | 90.10% |
| 1940s | 34.8 | 100.3 | 135.1 | 74.20% | 59.4 |
| 1950s | 256.7 | 180 | 436.7 | 41.2 | 54.6 |
| 1960s | 53.7 | 54.2 | 107.9 | 50.2 | 56 |
| 1970s | 17.2 | 59.1 | 76.3 | 77.5 | 45.5 |
| 1980s | 227.4 | 143.1 | 370.5 | 38.6 | 48.6 |
| 1990s | 315.7 | 95.5 | 411.2 | 23.2 | 47.6 |
| 2000s | -15 | 8.6 | -6.4 | N/A | 32.3 |
| Average | 106.10% | 87.10% | 193.20% | 50.80% | 54.30% |

For smaller, growth companies, the average payout ratio can be as low as 10%.

== See also ==
- Dividend
- Dividend yield
- Liquidating distribution
- Retention ratio
- Special dividend
- Sustainable growth rate
