= Retention ratio =

Percentage of profit a company keeps for itself

In corporate finance, the retention ratio indicates the percentage of a company's earnings that are not paid out in dividends to shareholders but credited to retained earnings. It is the opposite of the dividend payout ratio, and is a key indicator of how much profit a company is keeping to fund its operations, growth, and development.

The retention ratio can be calculated using the following formula, essentially, the amount of dividends the company pays out divided by its net income:

$$\text{Retention Ratio} = 1 - \text{Dividend Payout Ratio} = \frac{\text{Retained Earnings}}{\text{Net Income}}$$

This formula can be rearranged to show that the retention ratio plus payout ratio equals 1, or essentially 100%. That is to say that the amount paid out in dividends plus the amount kept by the company comprises all of net income.

== Use in sustainable growth analysis ==
The retention ratio is used in estimating a company's sustainable growth rate, which measures the rate at which earnings and dividends can grow while maintaining a given return on equity and dividend policy. In the basic sustainable growth model, the sustainable growth rate is calculated by multiplying the retention ratio by return on equity.

A higher retention ratio may support faster growth if retained earnings are reinvested at returns above the company's cost of equity. However, a high retention ratio does not by itself indicate value creation, because retained earnings may be invested in projects that earn inadequate returns. The ratio is therefore commonly interpreted alongside profitability measures such as return on equity and dividend policy measures such as the dividend payout ratio.
