= Gallagher v. Lambert =

1988 New York Supreme Court case

Gallagher v. Lambert, 143 A.D.2d 313 (1988), was a New York Supreme Court, Appellate Division case between Plaintiff James Gallagher and Benjamin Lambert at Eastdil Realty, Inc., his former employer. The case involves the scope of contract law in regards to dealing in good faith under employment termination and stock buyback options. The Appellate Division's decision was affirmed by the New York Court of Appeals.

== Background ==
Gallagher was an employee for Eastdil for many years. Beginning in 1983, with a capital reorganization of the company, Gallagher was given an 8.5% stake in the company, making him the third largest shareholder, with a stock buyback option that stated if his employment was terminated for any reason prior to January 31, 1985 the shares would be bought back at book-value, whereas after this date they would be bought back according to an earnings formula.

Twenty-one days before this date, Eastdil fired Gallagher for no apparent reason except to avoid paying for his shares at the new calculated price, which would have been much higher than book value. His shares were therefore bought back from the company at the lower book-value price.

Gallagher was upset with this move and filed a complaint with the court, stating that Eastdil had breached the good faith protocol and should therefore be required to pay him the share price after the January 31st point for the buyback. The lower court dismissed his complaint, citing he had knowingly entered a contract that had this provision. He subsequently appealed.

== Case ==
The court’s main concern was mainly in determining if Gallagher’s claim that Eastdil acted in ‘Bad Faith’ was correct or if it had performed its duty to the fullest legal extent. Gallagher claimed that his employment termination was based entirely on the company wanting to buy his shares at a lower price. He stated that this was an obvious and apparent breach of good faith that merited his being paid at their higher price.

The court deliberated on whether or not his termination had in fact been based solely to buy his shares back at the lower price, and, if so, if this constituted a breach of good faith given the contractual obligations of both parties.

== Decision ==
The Appellate Court believed that Eastdil had terminated Gallagher's employment solely for the purpose of avoiding buying the shares at a higher price. There was no other possible explanation for his termination. However, the court could not find how this was a breach of good faith. Gallagher had willingly and knowingly signed the conditions of the contract and had even been a part of the drafting process, along with having his attorneys view it in detail before he approved. Therefore, the court had no option but to conclude that his request to demand payment should be denied. Gallagher was required to accept the payment of his shares at book-value from the then present time.

== Significance ==
This case enforces a major precedent in contract law; contractual obligations can override most arguments of good faith. This also establishes that persons in similar situations must seek more defined contract terms to avoid similar outcomes in stock buybacks.
