= Capital gains tax in the United States =

Tax on investment gains

In the United States, individuals and corporations pay a tax on the net total of all their capital gains. The tax rate depends on both the investor's tax bracket and the amount of time the investment was held. Short-term capital gains are taxed at the investor's ordinary income tax rate and are defined as investments held for a year or less before being sold. Long-term capital gains, on dispositions of assets held for more than one year, are taxed at a lower rate.

== Current law ==
The United States taxes short-term capital gains at the same rate as it taxes ordinary income.

Long-term capital gains are taxed at lower rates shown in the table below. (Qualified dividends receive the same preference.)

Filing status and total long-term gains and qualified dividends – 2025					Tax rate
Single	Married filing jointly or qualified widow(er)	Married filing separately	Head of household	Trusts and estates	Tax rate
$0–$48,350	$0–$96,700	$0–$48,350	$0–$64,750	$0–$2,700(?)	0%
$48,351–$533,400	$96,701–$600,050	$48,351–$300,000	$64,751–$566,700	$2,701–$13,250(?)	15%
Over $533,400	Over $600,050	Over $300,000	Over $566,700	Over $13,250(?)	20%

However, taxpayers pay no tax on income covered by deductions: the standard deduction (for 2025, reflecting increases made by the One Big Beautiful Bill Act of 2025: $15,750 for an individual return, $23,625 for heads of households, and $31,500 for a joint return, increased for elderly and/or blind taxpayers), or more if the taxpayer has over that amount in itemized deductions. Amounts in excess of this are taxed at the rates in the above table.

Separately, the tax on collectibles and certain small business stock is capped at 28%. The tax on unrecaptured Section 1250 gain — the portion of gains on depreciable real estate (structures used for business purposes) that has been or could have been claimed as depreciation — is capped at 25%.

The income amounts ("tax brackets") were reset by the Tax Cuts and Jobs Act of 2017 for the 2018 tax year to equal the amount that would have been due under prior law. They are adjusted each year based on the Chained CPI measure of inflation.

=== Additional taxes ===
There may be taxes in addition to the tax rates shown in the above table.

- Taxpayers earning income above certain thresholds ($200,000 for singles and heads of household, $250,000 for married couples filing jointly and qualifying widowers with dependent children, and $125,000 for married couples filing separately) pay an additional 3.8% tax, known as the net investment income tax (NIIT), on investment income above their threshold, with additional limitations. Therefore, the top federal tax rate on long-term capital gains is 23.8%.
- State and local taxes often apply to capital gains. In a state whose tax is stated as a percentage of the federal tax liability, the percentage is easy to calculate. Some states structure their taxes differently. In this case, the treatment of long-term and short-term gains does not necessarily correspond to the federal treatment.

Capital gains do not push ordinary income into a higher income bracket. The Capital Gains and Qualified Dividends Worksheet in the Form 1040 instructions specifies a calculation that treats both long-term capital gains and qualified dividends as though they were the last income received, then applies the preferential tax rate as shown in the above table. Conversely, however, this means an increase in ordinary income will withdraw the 0% and 15% brackets for capital gains taxes.

=== Cost basis ===
The capital gain that is taxed is the excess of the sale price over the cost basis of the asset. The taxpayer reduces the sale price and increases the cost basis (reducing the capital gain on which tax is due) to reflect transaction costs such as brokerage fees, certain legal fees, and the transaction tax on sales.

==== Depreciation ====
In contrast, when a business is entitled to a depreciation deduction on an asset used in the business (such as for each year's wear on a piece of machinery), it reduces the cost basis of that asset by that amount, potentially to zero. The reduction in basis occurs whether or not the business claims the depreciation.

If the business then sells the asset for a gain (that is, for more than its adjusted cost basis), this part of the gain is called depreciation recapture. When selling certain real estate, it may be treated as capital gain. When selling equipment, however, depreciation recapture is generally taxed as ordinary income, not capital gain. Further, when selling some kinds of assets, none of the gain qualifies as capital gain.

==== Other gains in the course of business ====
If a business develops and sells properties, gains are taxed as business income rather than investment income. The Fifth Circuit Court of Appeals, in Byram v. United States (1983), set out criteria for making this decision and determining whether income qualifies for treatment as a capital gain.

==== Inherited property ====
Under the stepped-up basis rule, for an individual who inherits a capital asset, the cost basis is "stepped up" to its fair market value of the property at the time of the inheritance. When eventually sold, the capital gain or loss is only the difference in value from this stepped-up basis. Increase in value that occurred before the inheritance (such as during the life of the decedent) is never taxed.

==== Capital losses ====
If a taxpayer realizes both capital gains and capital losses in the same year, the losses offset (cancel out) the gains. The amount remaining after offsetting is the net gain or net loss used in the calculation of taxable gains.

For individuals, a net loss can be claimed as a tax deduction against ordinary income, up to $3,000 per year ($1,500 in the case of a married individual filing separately). Any remaining net loss can be carried over and applied against gains in future years. However, losses from the sale of personal property, including a residence, do not qualify for this treatment.

Corporations with net losses of any size can re-file their tax forms for the previous three years and use the losses to offset gains reported in those years. This results in a refund of capital gains taxes paid previously. After the carryback, a corporation can carry any unused portion of the loss forward for five years to offset future gains.

==== Return of capital ====
Corporations may declare that a payment to shareholders is a return of capital rather than a dividend. Dividends are taxable in the year that they are paid, while returns of capital work by decreasing the cost basis by the amount of the payment, and thus increasing the shareholder's eventual capital gain. Although most qualified dividends receive the same favorable tax treatment as long-term capital gains, the shareholder can defer taxation of a return of capital indefinitely by declining to sell the stock.

== History ==
US Capital Gains Taxes history chart

From 1913 to 1921, capital gains were taxed at ordinary rates, initially up to a maximum rate of 7%. The Revenue Act of 1921 allowed a tax rate of 12.5% gain for assets held at least two years. From 1934 to 1941, taxpayers could exclude from taxation up to 70% of gains on assets held 1, 2, 5, and 10 years. Beginning in 1942, taxpayers could exclude 50% of capital gains on assets held at least six months or elect a 25% alternative tax rate if their ordinary tax rate exceeded 50%. From 1954 to 1967, the maximum capital gains tax rate was 25%. Capital gains tax rates were significantly increased in the 1969 and 1976 Tax Reform Acts. In 1978, Congress eliminated the minimum tax on excluded gains and increased the exclusion to 60%, reducing the maximum rate to 28%. The 1981 tax rate reductions further reduced capital gains rates to a maximum of 20%.

The Tax Reform Act of 1986 repealed the exclusion of long-term gains, raising the maximum rate to 28% (33% for taxpayers subject to phaseouts). The 1990 and 1993 budget acts increased ordinary tax rates but re-established a lower rate of 28% for long-term gains, though effective tax rates sometimes exceeded 28% because of other tax provisions. The Taxpayer Relief Act of 1997 reduced capital gains tax rates to 10% and 20% and created the exclusion for one's primary residence. The Economic Growth and Tax Relief Reconciliation Act of 2001 reduced them further, to 8% and 18%, for assets held for five years or more. The Jobs and Growth Tax Relief Reconciliation Act of 2003 reduced the rates to 5% and 15%, and extended the preferential treatment to qualified dividends.

The 15% tax rate was extended through 2010 as a result of the Tax Increase Prevention and Reconciliation Act of 2005, then through 2012. The American Taxpayer Relief Act of 2012 made qualified dividends a permanent part of the tax code but added a 20% rate on income in the new, highest tax bracket.

The Emergency Economic Stabilization Act of 2008 caused the IRS to introduce Form 8949, and radically change Form 1099-B, so that brokers would report not just the amounts of sales proceeds but also the amounts of purchases to the IRS, enabling the IRS to verify reported capital gains.

The Small Business Jobs Act of 2010 exempted taxes on capital gains for angel and venture capital investors on small business stock investments if held for 5 years. It was a temporary measure but was extended through 2011 by the Tax Relief, Unemployment Insurance Reauthorization, and Job Creation Act of 2010 as a jobs stimulus.

In 2013, provisions of the Patient Protection and Affordable Care Act ("Obama-care") took effect that imposed the Medicare tax of 3.8% (formerly a payroll tax) on capital gains of high-income taxpayers.

=== Summary of recent history ===
From 1998 through 2017, tax law keyed the tax rate for long-term capital gains to the taxpayer's tax bracket for ordinary income, and set forth a lower rate for the capital gains. (Short-term capital gains have been taxed at the same rate as ordinary income for this entire period.) This approach was dropped by the Tax Cuts and Jobs Act of 2017, starting with tax year 2018.

July 1998 – 2000		2001 – May 2003		May 2003 – 2007		2008 – 2012	2013 – 2017	
Ordinary income tax rate	Long-term capital gains tax rate	Ordinary income tax rate	Long-term capital gains tax rate**	Ordinary income tax rate	Long-term capital gains tax rate	Long-term capital gains tax rate	Ordinary income tax rate	Long-term capital gains tax rate
15%	10%	10%	10%	10%	5%	0%	10%	0%
15%	10%	15%	10%	15%	5%	0%	15%	0%
28%	20%	27%*	20%	25%	15%	15%	25%	15%
31%	20%	30%*	20%	28%	15%	15%	28%	15%
36%	20%	35%*	20%	33%	15%	15%	33%	15%***
39.6%	20%	38.6%*	20%	35%	15%	15%	35%	15%***
39.6%	20%	38.6%*	20%	35%	15%	15%	39.6%	20%***

* This rate was reduced one-half percentage point for 2001 and one-half percentage point for 2002 and beyond.
** There was a two percentage point reduction for capital gains from certain assets held for more than five years, resulting in 8% and 18% rates.
*** The gain may also be subject to the 3.8% net investment income tax.

== State capital gains taxes ==
Most states tax capital gains as ordinary income. States that do not tax income (Alaska, Florida, Nevada, New Hampshire, South Dakota, Tennessee, Texas, and Wyoming) do not tax capital gains either. Washington state does not collect income taxes but has passed a capital gains tax as an excise (rather than income or property) tax.

== Rationale ==
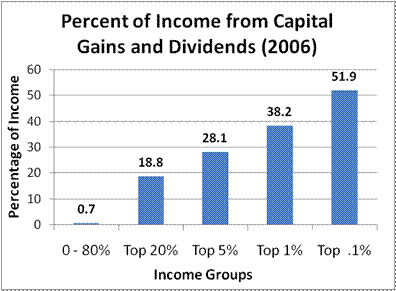
Percent of personal income from capital gains and dividends for different income groups (2006).

=== Who pays it ===
Capital gains taxes are disproportionately paid by high-income households, as they are more likely to own assets that generate the taxable gains. While this supports the argument that payers of capital gains taxes have more "ability to pay", it also means that the payers are more able to defer or avoid the tax, because it only comes due if and when the owner sells the asset.

Low-income taxpayers who do not pay capital gains taxes directly may pay them through changed prices as the actual payers pass through the cost of paying the tax. Another factor complicating the use of capital gains taxes to address income inequality is that capital gains are usually not recurring income. A taxpayer may be "high-income" in the single year in which he or she sells an asset or invention.

=== Existence of the tax ===
The existence of the capital gains tax is controversial. In 1995, to support the Contract with America legislative program of House Speaker Newt Gingrich, Stephen Moore and John Silvia wrote a study for the Cato Institute. In the study, they proposed halving of capital gains taxes, arguing that this move would "substantially raise tax collections and increase tax payments by the rich" and that it would increase economic growth and job creation. They wrote that the tax "is so economically inefficient...that the optimal economic policy...would be to abolish the tax entirely." More recently, Moore has written that the capital gains tax constitutes double taxation. "First, most capital gains come from the sale of financial assets like stock. But publicly held companies have to pay corporate income tax....Capital gains is a second tax on that income when the stock is sold."

Richard Epstein says that the capital-gains tax "slows down the shift in wealth from less to more productive uses" by imposing a cost on the decision to shift assets. He favors repeal or a rollover provision to defer the tax on gains that are reinvested.

=== Preferential rate ===
The lower rate on long-term capital gains, compared to the rate on ordinary income, is regarded by the political left, such as Sen. Bernie Sanders, as a "tax break" that excuses investors from paying their "fair share", or a "tax expenditure" that government could elect to stop spending. By contrast, Republicans favor lowering the capital gains tax rate to induce saving and investment. Also, the lower rate partly compensates for the fact that some capital gains reflect nothing but inflation between the time the asset is bought and the time it is sold. Stephen Moore writes, "when inflation is high....the tax rate can even rise above 100 percent", as when a taxpayer owes tax on a capital gain that does not result in any increase in real wealth.

=== Holding period ===
The one-year threshold between short-term and long-term capital gains is arbitrary and has changed over time. Short-term gains are disparaged as speculation and are perceived as self-interested, myopic, and destabilizing, while long-term gains are characterized as investment, which supposedly reflects a more stable commitment that is in the nation's interest. Others call this a false dichotomy. The holding period to qualify for favorable tax treatment has varied from six months to ten years (see History above). There was special treatment of assets held for five years during the presidency of George W. Bush. In her 2016 presidential campaign, Hillary Clinton advocated holding periods of up to six years with a sliding scale of tax rates.

=== Carried interest ===
Carried interest is the share of any profits that the general partners of private equity funds receive as compensation, despite not contributing any initial funds. The manager may also receive compensation that is a percentage of the assets under management. Tax law provides that when such managers take, as a fee, a portion of the gain realized in connection with the investments they manage, the manager's gain is afforded the same tax treatment as the client's gain. Thus, where the client realizes long-term capital gains, the manager's gain is a long-term capital gain—generally resulting in a lower tax rate for the manager than would be the case if the manager's income were not treated as a long-term capital gain. Under this treatment, the tax on a long-term gain does not depend on how investors and managers divide the gain.

This tax treatment is often called the "hedge-fund loophole", even though it is private equity funds that benefit from the treatment; hedge funds usually do not have long-term gains. It has been criticized as "indefensible" and a "gross unfairness", because it taxes management services at a preferential rate intended for long-term gains. Warren Buffett has used the term "coddling the super rich". One counterargument is that the preferential rate is warranted because a grant of carried interest is often deferred and contingent, making it less reliable than a regular salary.

The 2017 tax reform established a three-year holding period for these fund managers to qualify for the long-term capital-gains preference.

== Effects ==
The capital gains tax raises money for government but penalizes investment (by reducing the final rate of return). Proposals to change the tax rate from the current rate are accompanied by predictions on how it will affect both results. For example, an increase of the tax rate would be more of a disincentive to invest in assets, but would seem to raise more money for government. However, the Laffer curve suggests that the revenue increase might not be linear and might even be a decrease, as Laffer's "economic effect" begins to outweigh the "arithmetic effect." For example, a 10% rate increase (such as from 20% to 22%) might raise less than 10% additional tax revenue by inhibiting some transactions. Laffer postulated that a 100% tax rate results in no tax revenue.

Another economic effect that might make receipts differ from those predicted is that the United States competes for capital with other countries. A change in the capital gains rate could attract more foreign investment, or drive United States investors to invest abroad.

Congress sometimes directs the Congressional Budget Office (CBO) to estimate the effects of a bill to change the tax code. It is contentious on partisan grounds whether to direct the CBO to use dynamic scoring (to include economic effects), or static scoring that does not consider the bill's effect on the incentives of taxpayers. After failing to enact the Budget and Accounting Transparency Act of 2014, Republicans mandated dynamic scoring in a rule change at the start of 2015, to apply to the Fiscal Year 2016 and subsequent budgets.

=== Measuring the effect on the economy ===
Supporters of cuts in capital gains tax rates may argue that the current rate is on the falling side of the Laffer curve (past a point of diminishing returns) — that it is so high that its disincentive effect is dominant, and thus that a rate cut would "pay for itself." Opponents of cutting the capital gains tax rate argue the correlation between top tax rate and total economic growth is inconclusive.

Mark LaRochelle wrote on the conservative website Human Events that cutting the capital gains rate increases employment. He presented a U.S. Treasury chart to assert that "in general, capital gains taxes and GDP have an inverse relationship: when the rate goes up, the economy goes down". He also cited statistical correlation based on tax rate changes during the presidencies of George W. Bush, Bill Clinton, and Ronald Reagan.

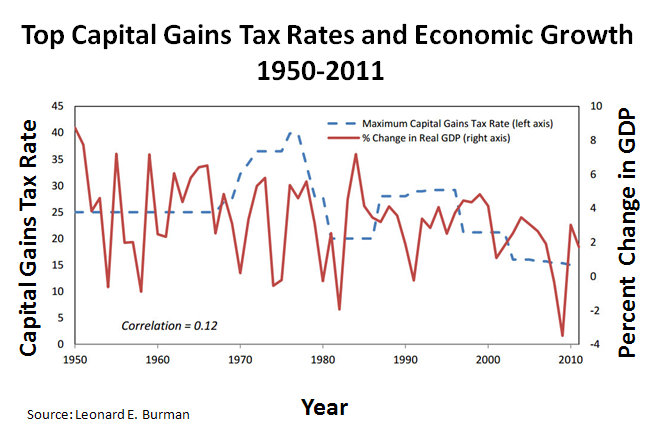
Top tax rates on long-term capital gains and real economic growth (measured as the percentage change in real GDP) from 1950 to 2011. Burman found low correlation (0.12) between low capital gains taxes and economic growth.

However, comparing capital gains tax rates and economic growth in America from 1950 to 2011, Brookings Institution economist Leonard Burman found "no statistically significant correlation between the two", even after using "lag times of five years." Burman's data are shown in the chart at right.

Economist Thomas L. Hungerford of the liberal Economic Policy Institute found "little or even a negative" correlation between capital gains tax reduction and rates of saving and investment, writing: "Saving rates have fallen over the past 30 years while the capital gains tax rate has fallen from 28% in 1987 to 15% today .... This suggests that changing capital gains tax rates have had little effect on private saving".

=== Factors that complicate measurement ===
Researchers usually use the top marginal tax rate to characterize policy as high-tax or low-tax. This figure measures the disincentive on the largest transactions per additional dollar of taxable income. However, this might not tell the complete story. The table Summary of recent history above shows that, although the marginal rate is higher now than at any time since 1998, there is also a substantial bracket on which the tax rate is 0%.

Another reason it is hard to prove correlation between the top capital gains rate and total economic output is that changes to the capital gains rate do not occur in isolation, but as part of a tax reform package. They may be accompanied by other measures to boost investment, and Congressional consensus to do so may derive from an economic shock, from which the economy may have been recovering independent of tax reform. A reform package may include increases and decreases in tax rates; the Tax Reform Act of 1986 increased the top capital gains rate, from 20% to 28%, as a compromise for reducing the top rate on ordinary income from 50% to 28%.

== Tax avoidance strategies ==
=== Strategic losses ===
The ability to use capital losses to offset capital gains in the same year is discussed above. Toward the end of a tax year, some investors sell assets that are worth less than the investor paid for them to obtain this tax benefit.

A wash sale, in which the investor sells an asset and buys it (or a similar asset) right back, cannot be treated as a loss at all, although there are other potential tax benefits as consolation.

In January, a new tax year begins; if stock prices increase, analysts may attribute the increase to an absence of such end-of-year selling and say there is a January effect. A Santa Claus rally is an increase in stock prices at the end of the year, perhaps in anticipation of a January effect.

=== Versus purchase ===
A taxpayer can designate that a sale of corporate stock corresponds to a specified purchase. For example, the taxpayer holding 500 shares may have bought 100 shares each on five occasions, probably at a different price each time. The individual lots of 100 shares are typically not held separate; even in the days of physical stock certificates, there was no indication which stock was bought when. If the taxpayer sells 100 shares, then by designating which of the five lots is being sold, the taxpayer will realize one of five different capital gains or losses. The taxpayer can maximize or minimize the gain depending on an overall strategy, such as generating losses to offset gains, or keeping the total in the range that is taxed at a lower rate or not at all.

To use this strategy, the taxpayer must specify at the time of a sale which lot is being sold (creating a "contemporaneous record"). This "versus purchase" sale is versus (against) a specified purchase. On brokerage websites, a "Lot Selector" may let the taxpayer specify the purchase to which a sell order corresponds.

=== Primary residence ===
Section 121 lets an individual exclude from gross income up to $250,000 ($500,000 for a married couple filing jointly) of gains on the sale of real property if the owner owned and used it as primary residence for two of the five years before the date of sale. The two years of residency do not have to be continuous. An individual may meet the ownership and use tests during different 2-year periods. A taxpayer can move and claim the primary-residence exclusion every two years if living in an area where home prices are rising rapidly.

The tests may be waived for military service, disability, partial residence, unforeseen events, and other reasons. Moving to shorten one's commute to a new job is not an unforeseen event. Bankruptcy of an employer that induces a move to a different city is likely an unforeseen event, but the exclusion will be pro-rated if one has stayed in the home less than two years.

The amount of this exclusion is not increased for home ownership beyond five years. One is not able to deduct a loss on the sale of one's home.

The exclusion is calculated in a pro-rata manner, based on the number of years used as a residence and the number of years the house is rented-out. For example, if a house is purchased, then rented-out for 4 years, then lived-in for 3 years, then sold, the owner is entitled to 3/7 of the exclusion. This method of calculating the primary residence exclusion was implemented in 2008, aimed at eliminating a loophole where owners could rent out a house for many years, then move into it for two years and get the full exclusion.

=== Deferral strategies ===
Taxpayers can defer capital gains taxes to a future tax year using the following strategies:

- Section 1031 exchange—If a business sells property but uses the proceeds to buy similar property, it may be treated as a "like kind" exchange. Tax is not due based on the sale; instead, the cost basis of the original property is applied to the new property.
- Structured sales, such as the self-directed installment sale, are sales that use a third party, in the style of an annuity. They permit sellers to defer recognition of gains on the sale of a business or real estate to the tax year in which the proceeds are received. Fees and complications should be weighed against the tax savings.
- Charitable trusts, set up to transfer assets to a charity upon death or after a term of years, normally avoid capital gains taxes on the appreciation of the assets, while allowing the original owner to benefit from the asset in the meantime.
- Opportunity Zone—Under the Tax Cuts and Jobs Act of 2017, investors who reinvest gains into a designated low-income "opportunity zone" can defer paying capital gains tax until 2026, or as long as they hold the reinvestment, and can reduce or eliminate capital gain liability depending on the number of years they own it.

== Proposals ==
=== Simpson-Bowles ===
In 2011, President Barack Obama signed Executive Order 13531 establishing the National Commission on Fiscal Responsibility and Reform (the "Simpson-Bowles Commission") to identify "policies to improve the fiscal situation in the medium term and to achieve fiscal sustainability over the long run". The Commission's final report took the same approach as the 1986 reform: eliminate the preferential tax rate for long-term capital gains in exchange for a lower top rate on ordinary income.

The tax change proposals made by the National Commission on Fiscal Responsibility and Reform were never introduced. Republicans supported the proposed fiscal policy changes, yet Obama failed to garner support among fellow Democrats; During the 2012 election, presidential candidate Mitt Romney faulted Obama for "missing the bus" on his own Commission.

=== In the 2016 campaign ===
Tax policy was a part of the 2016 presidential campaign, as candidates proposed changes to the tax code that affect the capital gains tax.

President Donald Trump's main proposed change to the capital gains tax was to repeal the 3.8% net investment income tax that took effect in 2013. He also proposed to repeal the Alternative Minimum Tax, which would reduce tax liability for taxpayers with large incomes including capital gains. His maximum tax rate of 15% on businesses could result in lower capital gains taxes. However, as well as lowering tax rates on ordinary income, he would lower the dollar amounts for the remaining tax brackets, which would subject more individual capital gains to the top (20%) tax rate. Other Republican candidates proposed to lower the capital gains tax (Ted Cruz proposed a 10% rate), or eliminate it entirely (such as Marco Rubio).

Democratic nominee Hillary Clinton proposed to increase the capital gains tax rate for high-income taxpayers by "creating several new, higher ordinary rates", and proposed a sliding scale for long-term capital gains, based on the time the asset was owned, up to 6 years. Gains on assets held from one to two years would be reclassified short-term and taxed as ordinary income, at an effective rate of up to 43.4%, and long-term assets not held for a full 6 years would also be taxed at a higher rate. Clinton also proposed to treat carried interest (see above) as ordinary income, increasing the tax on it, to impose a tax on "high-frequency" trading, and to take other steps. Bernie Sanders proposed to treat many capital gains as ordinary income, and increase the Medicare surtax to 6%, resulting in a top effective rate of 60% on some capital gains.

In the 115th Congress

The Republican Party introduced the American Health Care Act of 2017 (House Bill 1628), which would amend the Patient Protection and Affordable Care Act ("ACA" or "Obamacare") to repeal the 3.8% tax on all investment income for high-income taxpayers and the 2.5% "shared responsibility payment" ("individual mandate") for taxpayers who do not have an acceptable insurance policy, which applies to capital gains. The House passed this bill but the Senate did not.

=== 2017 tax reform ===
House Bill 1 (the Tax Cuts and Jobs Act of 2017) was released on November 2, 2017, by Chairman Kevin Brady of the House Ways and Means Committee. Its treatment of capital gains was comparable to current law, but it roughly doubled the standard deduction, while dropping personal exemptions in favor of a larger child tax credit. President Trump advocated using the bill to also repeal the shared responsibility payment, but Rep. Brady believed doing so would complicate passage. The House passed H.B. 1 on November 16.

The Senate version of H.B. 1 passed on December 2. It zeroed out the shared responsibility payment, but only beginning in 2019. Attempts to repeal "versus purchase" sales of stock (see above), and to make it harder to exclude gains on the sale of one's personal residence, did not survive the conference committee. Regarding "carried interest" (see above), the conference committee raised the holding period from one year to three to qualify for long-term capital-gains treatment.

The tax bills were "scored" to ensure their cost in lower government revenue was small enough to qualify under the Senate's reconciliation procedure. The law required this to use dynamic scoring (see above), but Larry Kudlow claimed that the scoring underestimated economic incentives and inflow of capital from abroad. To improve the scoring, changes to the personal income tax expired at the end of 2025, though they would be made permanent in Trump's second term with the One Big Beautiful Bill Act of 2025.

Both houses of Congress passed H.B. 1 on December 20 and President Trump signed it into law on December 22.

"Phase two"

In March 2018, Trump appointed Kudlow the assistant to the President for Economic Policy and Director of the National Economic Council, replacing Gary Cohn. Kudlow supports indexing the cost basis of taxable investments to avoid taxing gains that are merely the result of inflation, and has suggested that the law lets Trump direct the IRS to do so without a vote of Congress. The Treasury confirmed it was investigating the idea, but a lead Democrat said it would be “legally dubious” and meet with “stiff and vocal opposition”. In August 2018, Trump said indexation of capital gains would be "very easy to do", though telling reporters the next day that it might be perceived as benefitting the wealthy.

Trump and Kudlow both announced a "phase two" of tax reform, suggesting a new bill that included a lower capital gains rate. However, prospects for a follow-on tax bill dimmed after the Democratic Party took the House of Representatives in the 2018 elections.
