= Dividend cover =

Dividend cover, also commonly known as dividend coverage, is the ratio of company's earnings (net income) over the dividend paid to shareholders, calculated as net profit or loss attributable to ordinary shareholders by total ordinary dividend. So, if a company has net profit after tax of 2400 divided by total ordinary dividend of 1000, then dividend cover is 2.4. The dividend cover formula is the inverse of the dividend payout ratio.

Generally, a dividend cover of 2 or more is considered a safe coverage, as it allows the company to safely pay out dividends and still allow for reinvestment or the possibility of a downturn. A low dividend cover can make it impossible to pay the same level of dividends in a bad year's trading or to invest in company growth. A negative dividend cover is both unusual and a clear sign that the company is in trouble. The higher the cover, the more unlikely it is that the dividend will fall the following year.

== See also ==
- Liquidating dividend
- Special dividend
