= Dividend tax =

Tax levied on stock earnings

A dividend tax is a tax imposed by a jurisdiction on dividends paid by a corporation to its shareholders (stockholders). The primary tax liability is that of the shareholder, though a tax obligation may also be imposed on the corporation in the form of a withholding tax. In some cases the withholding tax may be the extent of the tax liability in relation to the dividend. A dividend tax is in addition to any tax imposed directly on the corporation on its profits. Some jurisdictions do not tax dividends.

To avoid a dividend tax being levied, a corporation may distribute surplus funds to shareholders by way of a share buy-back. These, however, are normally treated as capital gains, but may offer tax benefits when the tax rate on capital gains is lower than the tax rate on dividends. Another potential strategy is for a corporation not to distribute surplus funds to shareholders, who benefit from an increase in the value of their shareholding. These may also be subject to capital gain rules. Some private companies may transfer funds to controlling shareholders by way of loans, whether interest-bearing or not, instead of by way of a formal dividend, but many jurisdictions have rules that tax the practice as a dividend for tax purposes, called a "deemed dividend".

== History ==
In the beginning of income tax history, dividends paid to shareholders were exempt from taxation, as such tax was considered a form of double taxation on money earned by companies and subject to corporate tax.

Currently, in most jurisdictions, dividends from corporations are treated as a type of income and taxed accordingly at the individual level. Many jurisdictions have adopted special treatment of dividends, imposing a separate rate on dividends to wage income or capital gains.

Here is a brief history of dividend taxation:

- 17th century: The first dividend taxes were imposed in the 17th century in the Netherlands and England.
- 19th century: Dividend taxes became more common in the 19th century, as more countries adopted income taxes.
- United States: Dividend taxes were first imposed in the United States in 1913, with the passage of the 16th Amendment to the U.S. Constitution.
- 1936–1939: During the Great Depression, dividends were taxed at an individual's income tax rate.
- 1954: The Tax Reform Act of 1954 created a separate rate for dividends, which was lower than the individual income tax rate.
- 1981: The Economic Recovery Tax Act of 1981 further reduced the tax rate on dividends.
- 2003: The Jobs and Growth Tax Relief Reconciliation Act of 2003 reduced the tax rate on dividends to 15% for most investors.
- 2013: The American Taxpayer Relief Act of 2012 (ATRA) increased the tax rate on dividends to 20% for taxpayers in the top income tax bracket.

In the United States, the Revenue Act of 1913, authorized via the 16th Amendment, created a federal personal income tax of 1% with additional surtaxes of 1–5%, and exempted dividends from the general income tax but not the surtaxes which applied above the $20,000 level. This was to avoid the double taxation of income as there was a 1% corporate tax as well. After 1936, dividends were again subject to the ordinary income tax, but from 1954 to 1983 there were various exemptions and credits, taxing dividends at a lower rate. Following this, there was an eighteen-year period (1985–2003) in which dividends were fully taxed at an individual's income tax bracket. During this period, the top tax bracket ranged between 28% and 50%. However, in 2003 former president George W. Bush enacted the Jobs and Growth Tax Relief Reconciliation Act of 2003, which changed tax rates significantly. These 2003 tax cuts created a new category of qualified dividend that was taxed at the lower long-term capital gains rate instead of the ordinary income rate.

The current tax rate on dividends in the United States is 20% for taxpayers in the top income tax bracket, and 15% for taxpayers in the lower income tax brackets. There are also special rules for qualified dividends, which are dividends that are paid by companies that have met certain requirements. Qualified dividends are taxed at a lower rate of 0%, 15%, or 20%, depending on the taxpayer's income.

The history of dividend taxation outside the US is just as varied as it is in the US. Here is a brief overview of dividend taxation in some major countries:

- United Kingdom: In the financial year beginning 6 April 2024, dividends in the UK are taxed at a rate of 8.75% for basic rate taxpayers, 33.75% for higher rate taxpayers, and 39.35% for additional rate taxpayers. There is also a dividend allowance of £500 per year, which means that dividends up to £500 are tax-free. The rates have increased and the allowance reduced since 2022.
- Canada: Dividends in Canada are taxed at a rate of 50% for non-residents, and 15% for residents. There is also a dividend tax credit that can be used to reduce the amount of tax that is owed on dividends.
- Australia: Dividends in Australia are taxed at a rate of 30% for non-residents, and 15% for residents. There is also a dividend imputation system that allows shareholders to claim a credit for the taxes that the company has already paid on its profits.
- Japan: Dividends in Japan are taxed at a rate of 20% for non-residents, and 15% for residents. There is also a dividend exemption system that allows shareholders to exempt dividends from tax if they meet certain conditions.
- Germany: Dividends in Germany are taxed at a rate of 25% for non-residents, and 26.375% for residents. There is also a dividend tax credit that can be used to reduce the amount of tax that is owed on dividends.

=== Collection ===
In many jurisdictions, companies are subject to withhold obligations of a prescribed rate, paying this to the national revenue authorities and paying to shareholders only the balance of the dividend.

== Debate ==
Taxation of dividends is controversial, based on the issues of double taxation. Depending on the jurisdiction, dividends may be treated as "unearned income" (like interest and collected rents) and thus liable for income tax.

=== Arguments in favor ===
A corporation is a legal entity separate from its shareholders with a "life" of its own. As a separate entity, a corporation has the right to use public goods as an individual does, and is therefore obligated to help pay for the public goods through taxes.

Professor Confidence W. Amadi of West Georgia University has argued:

The greatest advantage of the corporate form of business organization is the limited liability protection accorded its owners. Taxation of corporate income is the price of that protection. This price must be worth the benefits since, according to the Internal Revenue Service (1996), corporations account for less than 20 percent of all U.S. business firms, but about 90 percent of U.S. business revenues and approximately 70 percent of U.S. business profits. The benefits of limited liability independent of those enjoyed by shareholders, the flexibility of change in ownership, and the immense ability to raise capital are all derived from the legal entity status accorded corporations by the law. This equal status requires that corporations pay income taxes.

Once it is established that a corporation is, for all important purposes, a separate legal entity, the issue becomes how transfers from one legal entity (corporations) to another legal entity (shareholders) should be taxed, not whether the money should be taxed. It can be argued that it is unfair and economically unproductive to tax income generated through active work at a higher rate than income generated through less active means.

A 2022 study in the American Economic Review found that a substantial increase in dividend tax rates in France led to reduced dividend payments by firms and greater re-investment of profits back into the firms. The study also found that the dividend taxes did not contribute to a misallocation of capital, but may instead have reduced a capital misallocation. The study was retracted after several inconsistencies in the data were pointed out by other researchers, some arguing that the alterations affected the results of the paper. The authors disputed that the results would have been altered.

=== Arguments against ===
Critics, such as the Cato Institute, argue that a dividend tax is an unfair "double taxation". (Note: US economists use the term "double taxation" in reference to the tax on dividends due to the fact that dividend income is paid out of corporate profits and represent a portion of the profit stream owned by shareholders. Since corporate profits are taxed first at the corporate tax rate, they are taxed again when paid out as dividends (or capital gains, which are a derivative of corporate profits). Note that in international usage, this term means the practice of taxing the same income in two different national jurisdictions.) Cato's position is:

First, high dividend taxes add to the income tax code's general bias against savings and investment. Second, high dividend taxes cause corporations to rely too much on debt rather than equity financing. Highly indebted firms are more vulnerable to bankruptcy in economic downturns. Third, high dividend taxes reduce the incentive to pay out dividends in favor of retained earnings. That may cause corporate executives to invest in wasteful or unprofitable projects.

Besides discussed above issues of whether taxing dividends is right and fair, a major issue is tax-induced distortions of economic incentives. For instance, quoting from: "Efforts to avoid the double tax on corporate earnings have created a misallocation of investment between the corporate and non-corporate sectors and rapid growth in the use of S corporations, partnerships, and other entities that do not pay corporate income tax."

The taxpayers retain the post-tax income, while the whole pre-tax income, tax including, forms the national resources. A mismatch between the actual income as perceived by taxpayers and the taxable income distorts economic incentives by providing tempting ways to boost their difference. It promotes tax planning to maximize the post-tax income to the detriment of the pre-tax one: "We have seen how preferences in the tax code cause taxpayers to devote more resources to tax-advantaged investments and activities at the expense of other more productive alternatives."

Shareholders control corporations and bear their tax burdens: "Economists at both the Treasury Department and the Congressional Budget Office assume that the burden of the corporate income tax is borne entirely by owners of capital." Both corporate tax and personal taxes on dividends and capital gains in combination reduce shareholders comprehensive income which includes the change in their stock portfolio value.

Changes of stock value are hard to legally define and timely tax. Parts of these changes have a legally recognizable source. E.g., cash earned by corporations can be taxed at the corporate level. But there are other "hidden" parts, e.g., when corporations gain valuable patents or see favorable markets shifts. They increase stock values but cannot be legally measured and timely taxed at the corporate level.

These parts can be realized and taxed at the shareholders level when dividends are paid or stock trade yields capital gains. However, when owners take dividends from their shares (or gains from selling them) their cash portfolio grows but the value of their stock portfolio shrinks by the same amount, resulting in no net comprehensive income. Instead, the earlier growth of stock values gets legally recognized and (belatedly) taxed. However, this also includes growth that reflects previously taxed corporate income, resulting in double taxation.

Many remedies have been discussed to reduce misallocation of investment, disincentive for trading shares and taking dividends that chills capital movement, and other distortions mentioned above. Some propose lower rates of taxes on dividends, capital gains, and corporate income or complete elimination of some of them. Others aim at a better match between undertaxed and overtaxed parts of income: "Dividends and capital gains taxes have low rates but apply largely to income already taxed at the corporate level. This is widely criticized. Making dividends paid from taxed income tax-free and allowing companies to deduct capital losses (up to per-share taxed income) on share repurchase would be more consistent than lower tax rates on dividends, capital gains, and corporate income.". Broadly accepted solutions to the problem are yet to be found; the issue remains highly controversial.

== Dividend tax policy ==
=== OECD tax rates ===
Share buy-backs are more tax-efficient than dividends when the tax rate on capital gains is lower than the tax rate on dividends.

Country	Top Marginal Tax Rate on Capital Gains (2021)	Top Marginal Dividend Tax Rate (2021)	Spread in Tax Rates
South Korea	0.0%	44.0%	+44.0%
Belgium	0.0%	30.0%	+30.0%
Slovenia	0.0%	27.5%	+27.5%
Switzerland	0.0%	22.3%	+22.3%
Luxembourg	0.0%	21.0%	+21.0%
Turkey	0.0%	20.0%	+20.0%
Ireland	33.0%	51.0%	+18.0%
New Zealand	0.0%	15.3%	+15.3%
Czech Republic	0.0%	15.0%	+15.0%
Canada	26.8%	39.3%	+12.5%
United Kingdom	28.0%	38.1%	+10.1%
Mexico	10.0%	17.1%	+7.1%
Slovakia	0.0%	7.0%	+7.0%
Israel	28.0%	33.0%	+5.0%
Australia	23.5%	24.3%	+0.8%
Austria	27.5%	27.5%	0.0%
Colombia	10.0%	10.0%	0.0%
Denmark	42.0%	42.0%	0.0%
France	34.0%	34.0%	0.0%
Germany	26.4%	26.4%	0.0%
Hungary	15.0%	15.0%	0.0%
Iceland	22.0%	22.0%	0.0%
Italy	26.0%	26.0%	0.0%
Japan	20.3%	20.3%	0.0%
Norway	31.7%	31.7%	0.0%
Poland	19.0%	19.0%	0.0%
Portugal	28.0%	28.0%	0.0%
Sweden	30.0%	30.0%	0.0%
Spain	26.0%	26.0%	0.0%
United States	29.2%	29.2%	0.0%
Netherlands	31.0%	26.9%	-4.1%
Lithuania	20.0%	15.0%	-5.0%
Finland	34.0%	28.9%	-5.1%
Chile	40.0%	33.3%	-6.7%
Greece	15.0%	5.0%	-10.0%
Estonia	20.0%	0.0%	-20.0%
Latvia	20.0%	0.0%	-20.0%

=== United States ===
In 2003, President George W. Bush proposed the elimination of the U.S. dividend tax saying that "double taxation is bad for our economy and falls especially hard on retired people". He also argued that while "it's fair to tax a company's profits, it's not fair to double-tax by taxing the shareholder on the same profits."

Dividend Taxation in the United States since 2003
2003 – 2007			2008 – 2012			2013 – forward		
Ordinary Income Tax Rate	Ordinary Dividend Tax Rate	Qualified Dividend Tax Rate	Ordinary Income Tax Rate	Ordinary Dividend Tax Rate	Qualified Dividend Tax Rate	Ordinary Income Tax Rate	Ordinary Dividend Tax Rate	Qualified Dividend Tax Rate
10%	10%	5%	10%	10%	0%	10%	10%	0%
15%	15%	5%	15%	15%	0%	15%	15%	0%
25%	25%	15%	25%	25%	15%	25%	25%	15%
28%	28%	15%	28%	28%	15%	28%	28%	15%
33%	33%	15%	33%	33%	15%	33%	33%	15%
35%	35%	15%	35%	35%	15%	35%	35%	15%
35%	35%	15%	35%	35%	15%	39.6%	39.6%	20%

Soon after, Congress passed the Jobs and Growth Tax Relief Reconciliation Act of 2003 (JGTRRA), which included some of the cuts Bush requested and which he signed into law on May 28, 2003. Under the new law, qualified dividends are taxed at the same rate as long-term capital gains, which is 15 percent for most individual taxpayers. Qualified dividends received by individuals in the 10% and 15% income tax brackets were taxed at 5% from 2003 to 2007. The qualified dividend tax rate was set to expire December 31, 2008; however, the Tax Increase Prevention and Reconciliation Act of 2005 (TIPRA) extended the lower tax rate through 2010 and further cut the tax rate on qualified dividends to 0% for individuals in the 10% and 15% income tax brackets. On December 17, 2010, President Barack Obama signed into law the Tax Relief, Unemployment Insurance Reauthorization and Job Creation Act of 2010. The legislation extends for two additional years the changes enacted to the taxation of dividends in the JGTRRA and TIPRA.

In addition, the Patient Protection and Affordable Care Act created a new Net Investment Income Tax (NIIT) of 3.8% that applies to dividends, capital gains, and several other forms of passive investment income, effective January 1, 2013. The NIIT applies to married taxpayers with modified adjusted gross income over $250,000, and single taxpayers with modified adjusted gross income over $200,000. Unlike the thresholds for ordinary income tax rates and the qualified dividend rates, the NIIT threshold is not inflation-adjusted.

Had the Bush-era federal income tax rates of 10, 15, 25, 28, 33 and 35 percent brackets been allowed to expire for tax year 2012, the rates would have increased to the Clinton-era rate schedule of 15, 28, 31, 36, and 39.6 percent. In that scenario, qualified dividends would no longer be taxed at the long-term capital gains rate, but would revert to being taxed at the taxpayer's regular income tax rate. However, the American Taxpayer Relief Act of 2012 (H.R. 8) was passed by the United States Congress and signed into law by President Barack Obama in the first days of 2013. This legislation extended the 0 and 15 percent capital gains and dividends tax rates for taxpayers whose income does not exceed the thresholds set for the highest income tax rate (39.6 percent). Those who exceed those thresholds ($400,000 for single filers; $425,000 for heads of households; $450,000 for joint filers; $11,950 for estates and trusts) became subject to a top rate of 20 percent for capital gains and dividends.

=== Canada ===
In Canada, there is taxation of dividends, which is compensated by a dividend tax credit (DTC) for personal income in dividends from Canadian corporations. An increase to the DTC was announced in the fall of 2005 in conjunction with the announcement that Canadian income trusts would not become subject to dividend taxation as had been feared. Effective tax rates on dividends will now range from negative to over 30% depending on income level and different provincial tax rates and credits. Starting 2006, the Government introduced the concept of eligible dividends. Income not eligible for the Small Business Deduction and therefore taxed at higher corporate tax rates, can be distributed to the shareholders and taxed at a lower personal tax rate.

=== India ===
In India, earlier dividends were taxed in the hands of the recipient as any other income. However, since 1 June 1997, all domestic companies were liable to pay a dividend distribution tax on the profits distributed as dividends resulting in a smaller net dividend to the recipients. The rate of taxation alternated between 10% and 20% until the tax was abolished with effect from 31 March 2002. The dividend distribution tax was also extended to dividends distributed since 1 June 1999 by domestic mutual funds, with the rate alternating between 10% and 20% in line with the rate for companies, up to 31 March 2002. However, dividends from open-ended equity oriented funds distributed between 1 April 1999 and 31 March 2002 were not taxed. Hence the dividends received from domestic companies since 1 June 1997, and domestic mutual funds since 1 June 1999, were made non-taxable in the hands of the recipients to avoid double-taxation, until 31 March 2002.

The budget for the financial year 2002–2003 proposed the removal of dividend distribution tax bringing back the regime of dividends being taxed in the hands of the recipients and the Finance Act 2002 implemented the proposal for dividends distributed since 1 April 2002. This fueled negative sentiments in the Indian stock markets causing stock prices to go down. However the next year there were wide expectations for the budget to be friendlier to the markets and the dividend distribution tax was reintroduced.

Hence the dividends received from domestic companies and mutual funds since 1 April 2003 were again made non-taxable at the hands of the recipients. However the new dividend distribution tax rate for companies was higher at 12.5%, and was increased with effect from 1 April 2007 to 15%. The Unit Trust of India converted some units to tax-free bonds. The taxation rate for mutual funds was originally 12.5% but was increased to 20% for dividends distributed to entities other than individuals with effect from 9 July 2004. With effect from 1 June 2006 all equity oriented funds were kept out of the tax net but the tax rate was increased to 25% for money market and liquid funds with effect from 1 April 2007.

Dividend income received by domestic companies until 31 March 1997 carried a deduction in computing the taxable income but the provision was removed with the advent of the dividend distribution tax. A deduction to the extent of received dividends redistributed in turn to their shareholders resurfaced briefly from 1 April 2002 to 31 March 2003 during the time the dividend distribution tax was removed to avoid double taxation of the dividends both in the hands of the company and its shareholders but there has been no similar provision for dividend distribution tax. However the budget for 2008–2009 proposes to remove the double taxation for the specific case of dividends received by a domestic holding company (with no parent company) from a subsidiary that is in turn distributed to its shareholders. Budget 2020-2021 saw abolishment of DDT (dividend distribution tax) and the dividend income being taxed in the hands of investor according to income tax slab rates.

=== Korea ===
Korea regulates the amount of possible dividends, payment time of dividends, and how to make decisions on dividends in the commercial law, since dividends are considered an outflow of profits from the company. Currently, 15.4 percent of dividend tax is collected as soon as the dividend is paid (private : 14% of the dividend income tax, residence tax : 1.4% of the dividend income tax). Separate taxation is possible below ₩20 million(€15 thousand) of dividend income, and if it is exceed, they become subject to total taxation. In addition, if the financial income (interest, dividend income) exceeds ₩20 million, a report of total income tax must be made. In the relationship between shareholders and creditors, the main principle of the commercial law is that the rights of company creditors should take precedence over those of shareholders who have limited liability to the property of the company. Stockholders always want to receive more money, but from the firm point of view, if they allocate too much money, the reduction of equity capital could lead to the failure of the company. That's why government regulates the possible amount of dividends.

=== Other countries ===
Australia, Chile and New Zealand have a dividend imputation system, which entitles shareholders to claim a tax credit for the franking credits attached to dividends, being a share of the corporate tax paid by the corporation. A recipient of a fully franked dividend on the top marginal tax rate will effectively pay only about 15% tax on the cash amount of the dividend. In effect, when distributed as dividends, the profits of a corporation are taxed at the average of the shareholders' marginal tax rates; otherwise they are taxed at the corporate tax rate.

In Armenia there has not been a dividend tax until the recently adopted tax law upon which citizens of Armenia pay 5% and non-citizens 10% of the annual income.

In Austria the KeSt (Kapitalertragsteuer) is used as dividend tax rate, which is 27.5% on dividends.

In Belgium there is a tax of 30% on dividends, known as "roerende voorheffing" (in Dutch) or "précompte mobilier" (in French). Citizens can claim back their taxes on the first 800 EUR (2021) of received dividends through their tax declaration.

In Brazil, dividends are tax-exempt.

In Bulgaria there is a tax of 5% on dividends.

In China, the dividend tax rate is 20%, but since June 13, 2005, 50% of the dividend is taxed.

In the Czech Republic there is a tax of 15% on dividends. Government in 2012 wanted to reduce double taxation on corporates income, but this did not pass in the end.

In Estonia, the regular dividend tax rate is 20%. Since a new law was conducted in 01.01.2018, companies can pay dividends with a tax rate of 14% ONLY to resident and non-resident juridical persons.

In Finland, there is a tax of 25,5% or 27,2% on dividends (85% of dividend is taxable capital income and capital gain tax rate is 30% for capital gains lower than 30 000 and 34% for the part that exceeds 30 000). However, effective tax rates are 45.5% or 47.2% for private person. That's because corporate earnings have already been taxed, which means that dividends are taxed twice. Corporate income tax is 20%.

In France the taxpayer chooses either a tax of 30% on dividends, or to include the dividend in his income tax calculation with a 40% rebate, plus 17.2% social tax.

In Germany there is a tax of 25% on dividends, known as "Abgeltungssteuer", plus a solidarity tax of 5.5% on the dividend tax. Effectually there is a tax of 26.375%.

In Greece there is a tax of 5% on dividends for private persons.

In Hong Kong, there is no dividend tax.

In Iran there are no taxes on dividends, according to article (105).

In Ireland, companies paying dividends must generally withhold tax at the standard rate (as of 2007, 20%) from the dividend and issue a tax voucher to include details of the tax paid. A person not liable to tax can reclaim it at the end of year, while a person liable to a higher rate of tax must declare it and pay the difference.

In Israel there is a tax of 28% on dividends for individuals and 33% for major shareholders (=above 10%). If a company receives a dividend, the tax is 0%.

In Italy there is a tax of 26% on dividends, known as "capital gain tax".

In Japan, there is a tax of 10% on dividends from listed stocks (7% for Nation, 3% for Region) while Jan 1st 2009 - Dec 31 2012, by tax reduction rule. After Jan 1st 2013, the tax of 20% on dividends from listed stocks (15% for Nation, 5% for Region). In case of an individual person who has over 5% of total issued stocks (value or number), he/she can not apply the tax reduction rule, so after Jan 1st 2009, should pay 20%(15%+5%). There is a tax of 20% on dividends from Non-listed stocks (20% for Nation, 0% for Region).

In Luxembourg, only 50% of dividends paid out by corporations is subject to tax in the hands of an individual tax payer at the applicable marginal tax rate. Therefore, dividends are taxed at up to 21% if received from a corporation that is subject to tax and up to 40% if received from a corporation that does not satisfy the "subject to tax" test.

In the Netherlands there's a tax on the assumed return on assets in general (except bank savings, for which a separate rate applies), regardless of the actual dividend, as part of the tax on savings and investments. For major shareholders (over 5%) there is a different tax scheme, based on the actual dividend (in addition to the profit tax paid by the company).

In Norway dividends are taxed as capital gains, at a flat 31.7% tax rate. However a "shelter deduction" is applied to the dividend income to compensate for the lost interest income. The size of the shelter deduction is based on the interest rate on short term government bonds and was 1.1% in 2013. For example, if NOK 100,000 has been invested in a company stock that gave a dividend of NOK 4,000, the shelter deduction is NOK 1,100 (1.1% of NOK 100,000) and the remaining NOK 2,900 is taxed at 27%.

In Pakistan income tax of 10% as required by the Income Tax Ordinace, 2001 on the amount of dividend is deducted at source. A surcharge of 15% on income tax is withheld and will be duly paid by the company to Government of Pakistan as per Income Tax (Amendment) Ordinance, 2011.

In Poland there is a tax of 19% on dividends. This rate is equal to the rates of capital gains and other taxes.

In Romania there is a tax of 5% paid to private investors and 16% when paid to companies, on dividends since 1 February 2017. Additionally, private investors must pay a 5.5% healthcare tax on earnings from dividends.

In Singapore, there is no dividend tax.

In Slovakia, tax residents' income from dividends is not subject to income taxation in the Slovak Republic pursuant to Article 12 Section 7 Letter c) for legal entities and to Article 3 Section 2 Letter c) for individual entities of Income Tax Act No. 595/2003 Coll. as amended. This applies to dividends from profits relating to the calendar year 2004 onwards (regardless of when the dividends were actually paid out). Before that, dividends were taxed as normal income. The stated justification is that tax at 19 percent has already been paid by the company as part of its corporation tax (in Slovak "Income Tax for a Legal Entity"). However, there is no provision for residents to reclaim tax on dividends withheld in other jurisdictions with which Slovakia has a double-taxation treaty. Foreign resident owners of shares in Slovak companies may have to declare and pay tax in their local jurisdiction. Shares of profits made by investment funds are taxable as income at 19 percent. Resident natural persons have to pay 14% of received dividends as health insurance with maximum payment of €14,000, non-resident natural persons and companies are not subject of this "capital gain health tax".

In South Africa there is a tax of 20% on dividends.

In Spain, dividends are taxed between 19 and 23%, based on yearly dividend income. This tax rate is applicable between 2016 and 2019.

In Sweden there is a tax of 30% on dividends.

In Taiwan, the dividends are taken into account in the taxation of one's gross income, though varying from one stock to another, there is a specific deduction rate to the gross income tax if one holds this corresponding stock on the in-dividend date (once per year). Beginning from January 2013, there will be an additional 2% "tax" on all dividends, serving as the supplemental premium for the second-generation National Health Insurance (NHI) of Taiwan.

In Turkey there is an income tax withholding of 20% on dividends. Dividend income from foreign sources are taxed at the marginal tax rates. As of 2020, highest marginal tax rate is 40%.

In the United Arab Emirates, there is no dividend tax.

In the United Kingdom, companies pay UK corporation tax on their profits and the remainder can be paid to shareholders as dividends. From April 2018, the first £2,000 of dividend income is untaxed, regardless of the taxpayer's other income; the value of this allowance has since been varied: see Dividend imputation#United Kingdom. Dividends above the value of the allowance are taxed at 7.5% in basic rate income tax band, 32.5% in higher rate income tax band and 38.1% in additional rate income tax band.

== See also ==
- Corporate tax: company shareholder taxation
- Passive income
- Estate tax (United States)
- State income tax
- Double taxation
- Taxation in the United States
- Withholding tax
