= Dividend yield =

Financial ratio of dividends to share price

The dividend yield of a share is the ratio of annualised cash dividends to the share's current market price. It is usually expressed as a percentage and is commonly calculated by dividing the annual dividend per share by the current share price.

Closely related measures compare dividends to price and are often referred to as the dividend–price ratio. At the company level, the same idea can be expressed as total annual dividends divided by the company’s market capitalisation, assuming the number of shares remains unchanged.

Dividend yield measures dividend income only; it does not include changes in the share price and therefore differs from total return. Reported yields depend on convention: some use a trailing yield, or dividends paid over the previous 12 months, while others use a forward yield, or an indicated dividend based on recent declarations, which may exclude special dividends. Because both dividends and prices can change, a high dividend yield can reflect a higher payout, a lower share price, or expectations that dividends will be reduced.

== Definition and basic calculation ==
Dividend yield is the ratio of a share's annualised cash dividend to its current market price, usually expressed as a percentage. It is commonly written as

$$\text{Dividend yield}=\frac{\text{Annualised dividend per share}}{\text{Current share price}}.$$

The same ratio can be expressed at the company level as total annual dividends divided by the company's market capitalisation, when the number of shares is unchanged, this is equivalent to the per-share calculation. For example, a share priced at US$20 paying US$1 in dividends over a year has a dividend yield of 5%.

== Calculation conventions ==
Published dividend yields are not fully standardised. Data providers and index methodologies may use different conventions, including whether yields are based on dividends paid over the prior year or on an estimate for the coming year, and how non-recurring payments and other distributions are treated.

=== Trailing dividend yield ===
A trailing dividend yield uses dividends actually paid over the previous 12 months, expressed as a percentage of the current share price.

For example, if a company paid four quarterly dividends of US$0.25 over the last 12 months (US$1.00 total) and the current share price is US$20, the trailing dividend yield is:

$$\frac{1.00}{20}=0.05=5\%.$$

=== Forward dividend yield ===
A forward dividend yield uses a projection of dividends for the coming 12 months. One common approach is to annualise the most recent periodic dividend (for example, a quarterly dividend multiplied by four), though some use analyst estimates or company guidance instead.

For example, if the most recent quarterly dividend is US$0.30, an annualised forward dividend is US$1.20. At a current price of US$24, the forward dividend yield is:

$$\frac{1.20}{24}=0.05=5\%.$$

=== Indicated dividend yield ===
An indicated dividend yield uses the most recently announced dividend annualised by payment frequency and divided by the current market price. In Bloomberg's equity index methodology, dividend indicated yield is defined this way using the most recently announced gross dividend and dividend frequency.

For example, if the most recently announced dividend is US$0.40 and the dividend is paid quarterly, the indicated annual dividend is US$1.60. At a current price of US$32, the indicated dividend yield is:

$$\frac{1.60}{32}=0.05=5\%.$$

=== Special dividends and other distributions ===
Methodologies can differ in whether special dividends are included when forming annualized dividend inputs. For example, S&P Dow Jones Indices defines an indicated annual dividend for some dividend indices and specifies that special dividends are excluded in certain indicated-yield calculations. Methodologies may differ in what counts as an eligible dividend for selection or weighting rules. For some index uses, S&P Dow Jones Indices states that only cash dividend payments declared as regular by the paying company are considered for index eligibility, selection, and weighting rules, with other distributions treated differently.

For example, suppose a company paid regular quarterly dividends totalling US$1.00 over the last year and paid a one-time special dividend of US$1.00. If the current price is US$20, a yield that includes both payments would be:

$$\frac{2.00}{20}=0.10=10\%.$$

A yield computed using regular dividends only would be:

$$\frac{1.00}{20}=0.05=5\%.$$

== Interpretation and uses ==
Dividend yield is commonly used to compare dividend income relative to share price across dividend-paying companies or funds. Because dividend yield considers dividends only, it is distinct from total return, which combines dividend income with changes in market price.

=== Valuation and implied expected return ===
Dividend yield is an input to valuation and expected-return frameworks that start from dividends (or broader cash flows) and discount them to a present value. The constant-growth dividend discount model implies that, under its assumptions, the cost of equity can be expressed as dividend yield plus an expected growth rate. The Federal Reserve Bank of New York’s review of equity risk premium models describes dividend discount models as approaches that infer discount rates (and hence expected returns) from current prices and expected future cash flows, which can include dividends and other payouts.

=== Academic research on dividend yield and return predictability ===
Fama and French report that dividend yields have forecasting power for stock returns that increases with the return horizon in their tests (see Fama–French three-factor model).

Campbell and Shiller developed a framework in which the dividend–price ratio reflects expectations about future dividend growth and discount rates (expected returns). Cochrane’s survey of discount-rate variation similarly discusses how movements in dividend yields can be interpreted as changes in discount rates and expected returns in present-value relations.

=== Dividend-focused indices and screening ===
S&P Dow Jones Indices’ methodology for the Dow Jones dividend index family describes indices that are weighted by measures including dividend yield and indicated annual dividends, subject to constraints that can include caps and other rules.

MSCI’s methodology for its high dividend yield indices describes an approach that selects securities with dividend yields above a parent index level and applies dividend sustainability and persistence screens, such as excluding securities with extremely high payout ratios or negative dividend growth measures, before weighting constituents.

=== Dividend yield and broader payout measures ===
Dividend yield does not capture other ways companies return cash to shareholders, such as share repurchases. Some academic work therefore uses broader payout measures (for example, payout yield) that combine dividends with net repurchases when studying valuation and expected returns. The New York Fed review similarly notes that cash flows to stockholders can include dividends as well as buybacks and other transactions, although the literature often focuses on dividend distributions.

== Analysis ==
Historically, a higher dividend yield has been considered to be desirable among many investors. A high dividend yield can be considered to be evidence that a stock is underpriced or that the company has fallen on hard times and future dividends will not be as high as previous ones. Similarly a low dividend yield can be considered evidence that the stock is overpriced or that future dividends might be higher. Some investors may find a higher dividend yield attractive, for instance as an aid to marketing a fund to retail investors, or maybe because they cannot get their hands on the capital, which may be tied up in a trust arrangement. In contrast some investors may find a higher dividend yield unattractive, perhaps because it increases their tax bill.

Dividend yield fell out of favor somewhat during the 1990s because of an increasing emphasis on price appreciation over dividends as the main form of return on investments.

The importance of the dividend yield in determining investment strength is still a debated topic; most recently, Foye and Valentincic (2017) suggested that high dividend yield stocks tend to outperform. The persistent historic low in the Dow Jones dividend yield during the early 21st century is considered by some investors as indicative that the market is still overvalued.

=== Dow Industrials ===
The dividend yield of the Dow Jones Industrial Average, which is obtained from the annual dividends of all 30 companies in the average divided by their cumulative stock price, has also been considered to be an important indicator of the strength of the U.S. stock market. Historically, the Dow Jones dividend yield has fluctuated between 3.2% (during market highs, for example in 1929) and around 8.0% (during typical market lows). The highest ever Dow Jones dividend yield occurred in 1932 when it yielded over 15%, which was years after the famous stock market collapse of 1929, when it yielded only 3.1%.

With the decreased emphasis on dividends since the mid-1990s, the Dow Jones dividend yield has fallen well below its historical low-water mark of 3.2% and reached as low as 1.4% during the stock market peak of 2000.

The Dogs of the Dow is a popular investment strategy which invests in the ten highest dividend yield Dow stocks at the beginning of each calendar year.

=== S&P 500 ===
In 1982 the dividend yield on the S&P 500 Index reached 6.7%. Over the following 16 years, the dividend yield declined to just a percentage value of 1.4% during 1998, because stock prices increased faster than dividend payments from earnings, and public company earnings increased more slowly than stock prices. During the 20th century, the highest growth rates for earnings and dividends over any 30-year period were 6.3% annually for dividends, and 7.8% for earnings.

== Limitations and pitfalls ==
Dividend yield reflects dividend income relative to the current share price, but dividends can be reduced or discontinued. MSCI notes that trailing yields can rise when prices fall and may then decline if dividends are reduced or stopped, a pattern sometimes described as a "yield trap".

Dividend yield can also be misleading when used in isolation because it does not incorporate changes in share price or other factors that affect distributions. JPMorgan Chase notes that company performance, market volatility, and changes in dividend policy can affect dividend yield and that yield alone can be misleading.

For pooled vehicles, distributions described as "dividends" may include amounts that are not investment income. The U.S. Securities and Exchange Commission notes that mutual fund distributions may include a return of capital, and that investors should not mistake return of capital for yield or total return.

== Variants and related measures ==
In empirical finance, the term dividend–price ratio is often used for closely related measures of dividends relative to price. Boudoukh et al. note that the dividend–price ratio and dividend yield are sometimes defined using different timing conventions for dividends and the price used in the denominator. The reciprocal measure is sometimes expressed as a price–dividend ratio.

Dividend yield is discussed alongside measures of dividend sustainability. The dividend payout ratio is commonly defined as common-share dividends divided by net income attributable to common shares.

In some personal finance writing, yield on cost is used for a dividend yield computed using an investor's purchase price (cost basis) rather than the current market price. Morningstar Office describes a "current yield on cost" calculation that replaces the current price with the lot cost in yield calculations.

== Preferred shares ==
Dividend yield is most often discussed for common shares, but similar yield calculations are used for preferred shares. Fidelity notes that a current yield (commonly referred to as "dividend yield" for traditional preferred securities) can be calculated by dividing the annual dividend (or interest) payment by the current market price.

=== Current yield ===
A preferred share's current yield is typically calculated as the annual dividend divided by the current market price.

For example, if a preferred share pays US$1.50 per year in dividends and trades at US$25, the current yield is:

$$\frac{1.50}{25}=0.06=6\%.$$

=== Yield to call ===
Many preferred shares are callable. FINRA defines yield to call as a yield measure that assumes a callable security is redeemed on a specified call date.

For example, suppose a preferred share has a par (call) value of US$25, pays US$1.50 per year, can be called in 2 years, and trades at US$26. A simple (approximate) yield-to-call calculation treats the expected loss of US$1.00 over 2 years as reducing income by US$0.50 per year:

$$\frac{1.50-0.50}{26}\approx \frac{1.00}{26}\approx 3.85\%.$$

Note, the actual yield to call is normally computed as an internal rate of return using the call date cash flows.

=== Yield to worst ===
FINRA defines yield to worst as the lower of yield to maturity and yield to call. For callable preferred shares, yield-to-worst is often used to summarise the lowest yield that could occur under the security's redemption assumptions.

For example, if a preferred share has an estimated yield to call of 3.85% (as above) and an estimated yield to maturity of 5.2%, yield to worst would be 3.85%, the lower of the two yields.

== See also ==
- Cost of capital
- Dividend payout ratio
- Earnings yield
- Liquidating dividend
- P/E ratio
- List of finance topics
