= Retained earnings =

Accumulated net income of the corporation that is retained by the corporation

The retained earnings (also known as plowback) of a corporation is the accumulated net income of the corporation that is retained by the corporation at a particular point in time, such as at the end of the reporting period. At the end of that period, the net income (or net loss) at that point is transferred from the Profit and Loss Account to the retained earnings account. If the balance of the retained earnings account is negative it may be called accumulated losses, retained losses, accumulated deficit, or similar terminology.

Any part of a credit balance in the account can be capitalised, by the issue of bonus shares, and the balance is available for distribution of dividends to shareholders, and the residue is carried forward into the next period. Some laws, including those of most states in the United States require that dividends be only paid out of the positive balance of the retained earnings account at the time that payment is to be made. This protects creditors from a company being liquidated through dividends. A few states, however, allow payment of dividends to continue to increase a corporation’s accumulated deficit. This is known as a liquidating dividend or liquidating cash dividend.

In accounting, the retained earnings at the end of one accounting period are the opening retained earnings in the next period, to which is added the net income or net loss for that period and from which is deducted the bonus shares issued in the year and dividends paid in that period.

If a company is publicly held, the balance of retained earnings account that is negatively referred to as "accumulated deficit" may appear in the Accountant's Opinion in what is called the "Ongoing Concern" statement located at the end of required SEC financial reporting at the end of each quarter.

Retained earnings are reported in the shareholders' equity section of the corporation's balance sheet. Corporations with net accumulated losses may refer to negative shareholders' equity as positive shareholders' deficit. A report of the movements in retained earnings is presented along with other comprehensive income and changes in share capital in the statement of changes in equity.

Due to the nature of double-entry accrual accounting, retained earnings do not represent surplus cash available to a company. Rather, they represent how the company has managed its profits (i.e. whether it has distributed them as dividends or reinvested them in the business). When reinvested, those retained earnings are reflected as increases in assets (which could include cash) or reductions to liabilities on the balance sheet.

== Stockholders' equity ==
When total assets are greater than total liabilities, stockholders have a positive equity (positive book value). Conversely, when total liabilities are greater than total assets, stockholders have a negative stockholders' equity (negative book value) — also sometimes called stockholders' deficit. A stockholders' deficit does not mean that stockholders owe money to the corporation as they own only its net assets and are not accountable for its liabilities, though it is one of the definitions of insolvency. This means that the value of the assets of the company must rise above its liabilities before the stockholders hold positive equity value in the company.

Retained earnings = opening retained earnings + current year net profit from p&l a/c – dividends paid in the current year

== Tax implications ==
A company is normally subject to a company tax on the net income of the company in a financial year. The amount added to retained earnings is generally the after tax net income. In most cases in most jurisdictions no tax is payable on the accumulated earnings retained by a company. However, this creates a potential for tax avoidance, because the corporate tax rate is usually lower than the higher marginal rates for some individual taxpayers. Higher income taxpayers could "park" income inside a private company instead of being paid out as a dividend and then taxed at the individual rates. To remove this tax benefit, some jurisdictions impose an "undistributed profits tax" on retained earnings of private companies, usually at the highest individual marginal tax rate.

The issue of bonus shares, even if funded out of retained earnings, will in most jurisdictions not be treated as a dividend distribution and not taxed in the hands of the shareholder.

Retaining earnings by a company increases the company's shareholder equity, which increases the value of each shareholder's shareholding. This increases the share price, which may result in a capital gains tax liability when the shares are disposed of.

The decision of whether a corporation should retain net income or have it paid out as dividends depends on several factors including, but not limited to:

- Tax treatment of dividends, and
- Funds required for reinvestment in the corporation (called retention).

A number of factors affect the decision of the amount of profit that a corporation should retain, including:

- Quantum of net profit.
- Age of the business enterprise
- Dividend policy of the corporation
- Future plan regarding modernization and expansion.

== See also ==
- Dividend cover
- Dividend payout ratio
- Liquidating dividend
- Reserve (accounting)
