= Qualified dividend =

Type of dividend in the US tax code

Qualified dividends, as defined by the U.S. Internal Revenue Code, are ordinary dividends that meet specific criteria to be taxed at the lower long-term capital gains tax rate rather than at a higher tax rate for an individual's ordinary income. The rates on qualified dividends range from 0% to 23.8%. The category of qualified dividend (as opposed to an ordinary dividend) was created in the Jobs and Growth Tax Relief Reconciliation Act of 2003—previously, there was no distinction and all dividends were either untaxed or taxed together at the same rate.

To qualify for the qualified-dividend rate, the payee must own the stock for a long-enough time, generally 60 days for common stock and 90 days for preferred stock.

To qualify for the qualified-dividend rate, the dividend must also be paid by a corporation in the U.S. or with certain ties to the U.S.

== Requirements ==
The dividend qualifies for the qualified-dividend rate if all the following are true:

- It was paid after December 31, 2002.
- It was paid by a U.S. corporation, by a corporation incorporated in a U.S. possession, by a foreign corporation located in a country that is eligible for benefits under a U.S. tax treaty that meets certain criteria, or on a foreign corporation's stock that can be readily traded on an established U.S. stock market (e.g., an American depositary receipt, or ADR).
- It meets holding-period requirements: The individual must have held the stock for more than 60 days during the 121-day period that begins 60 days before the ex-dividend date. The ex-dividend date is the first date following the declaration of a dividend on which the buyer of a stock is not entitled to receive the next dividend payment. For calculation purposes, the number of days of ownership includes the day of disposition but not the day of acquisition.

In the case of preferred stock, the individual must have held the stock more than 90 days during the 181-day period that begins 90 days before the ex-dividend date if the dividends are due to periods totaling more than 366 days.

For dividends that do not meet the above criteria, the tax is determined by the date when the dividend was paid and the individual's ordinary income-tax bracket.

== Rates ==
=== Current rates ===
Qualified dividend income tax rate	Filing status and annual income – 2026				
Qualified dividend income tax rate	Single	Married filing jointly or qualified widow(er)	Married filing separately	Head of household	Trusts and estates
0%	$0–$49,450	$0–$98,900	$0–$49,450	$0–$66,200	
15%	$49,450–$545,500	$98,900–$613,700	$49,450–$306,850	$66,200–$579,600	
20%	Over $545,500	Over $613,700	Over $306,850	Over $579,600	

After the Tax Cuts and Jobs Act of 2017 (TCJA), the qualified dividend and long-term capital gain tax brackets are no longer based on current ordinary income brackets, but rather on pre-TCJA brackets.

=== 2003–2017 rates ===
Qualified dividend taxation in the United States: 2003–2017
	2003–2007		2008–2012		2013 - 2017	
Ordinary income tax rate	Ordinary dividend tax rate	Qualified dividend tax rate	Ordinary dividend tax rate	Qualified dividend tax rate	Ordinary dividend tax rate	Qualified dividend tax rate
10%	10%	5%	10%	0%	10%	0%
15%	15%	5%	15%	0%	15%	0%
25%	25%	15%	25%	15%	25-28.8*%	15-18.8*%
28%	28%	15%	28%	15%	28-31.8*%	15-18.8*%
33%	33%	15%	33%	15%	33-36.8*%	15-18.8*%
35%	35%	15%	35%	15%	35-38.8*%	15-18.8*%
39.6%	N/A	N/A	N/A	N/A	39.6-43.4*%	20-23.8*%

* 3.8% Net investment income tax enacted in 2013. See IRS Form 8960.

== History ==
With the creation of the personal federal income tax in 1913 until 1935, dividends in general were subject to the surtax of 1–6% that applied on incomes above $20,000, but not to the ordinary 1% income tax that applied to all incomes. With the Revenue Act of 1936 through 1953, dividends were subject to all income taxation again at the individual level. From 1954 to 1984, a dividend income exemption was introduced that initially started at $50, and a 4% tax credit for dividends above the exemption. The tax credit was reduced to 2% for tax year 1964 and removed for 1965 and later. From 1985 to 2002, dividends were fully taxed under ordinary income rates, without any exemption.

The category of a qualified dividend was created with the Jobs and Growth Tax Relief Reconciliation Act of 2003 ("JGTRRA"), that reduced all taxpayers' personal income tax rates and cut the tax rate on qualified dividends from the ordinary income tax rates to the lower long-term capital gains tax rates. At the same time the bill reduced the maximum long-term capital gains tax rate from 20% to 15% and established a 5% long-term capital gains tax rate for taxpayers in the 10% and 15% ordinary income tax brackets. The Tax Increase Prevention and Reconciliation Act of 2005 ("TIPRA") prevented several tax provisions of the 2003 bill from sunsetting until 2010 and further lowered the tax rate on qualified dividends and long-term capital gains to 0% from 5% for low to middle income taxpayers in the 10% and 15% ordinary income tax bracket. The Tax Relief, Unemployment Insurance Reauthorization, and Job Creation Act of 2010 extended for two additional years the changes enacted to the taxation of qualified dividends in the JGTRRA and TIPRA. The American Taxpayer Relief Act of 2012 (signed on January 2, 2013) made qualified dividends a permanent part of the tax code but added a 20% rate on income in the new highest 39.6% tax bracket.

From 2003 to 2007, qualified dividends were taxed at 15% or 5% depending on the individual's ordinary income tax bracket, and from 2008 to 2012, the tax rate on qualified dividends was reduced to 0% for taxpayers in the 10% and 15% ordinary income tax brackets, and starting in 2013 the rates on qualified dividends are 0%, 15% and 20%. The 20% rate is for taxpayers in the 39.6% tax bracket.

== See also ==
- Form 1099
- Dividend tax
