= Dividend reinvestment plan =

Equity investment option

A dividend reinvestment program or dividend reinvestment plan (DRIP) is an equity investment option offered directly from the underlying company. The investor does not receive dividends directly as cash; instead, the investor's dividends are directly reinvested in the underlying equity. The investor must still pay tax annually on his or her dividend income, whether it is received as cash or reinvested.

DRIPs allow the investment return from dividends to be immediately invested for the purpose of price appreciation and compounding, without incurring brokerage fees or waiting to accumulate enough cash for a full share of stock. Some DRIPs are free of charge for participants, while others do charge fees and/or proportional commissions.

Similarly income trusts and closed-end funds, which are numerous in Canada, can offer a distribution reinvestment plan and a unit purchase plan which operate principally the same as other plans.

Because DRIPs, by their nature, encourage long-term investment rather than active trading, they tend to have a stabilizing influence on stock prices.

== Cash purchase ==
Although the name implies that reinvesting dividends is the main purpose of these plans, many companies offer a complementary share purchase plan (SPP). An SPP allows the enrollee to make periodic optional cash purchases (OCPs) of company stock. The dollar amount of the OCP is sometimes subject to minimum and maximum limits, e.g. a minimum of $25 per OCP or a maximum that cannot exceed $100,000 per year. Low-fee or no-fee SPPs may be advantageous to enrollees as they offer a quick and cost-effective way to increase their holdings. And just like when dividends are reinvested, optional cash purchases are for fractional shares to 3 or 4 decimal places.

Dividend Reinvestment Plans (DRIPs) are investment programs that allow shareholders to automatically reinvest their cash dividends into additional whole or fractional shares of the issuing company. By consistently reinvesting dividends over extended periods, investors utilize the mechanism of dollar-cost averaging, a strategy that involves investing a fixed dollar amount at regular intervals—in this case, whenever a dividend is paid—regardless of the current share price.

This systematic approach allows investors to purchase more shares when prices are low and fewer shares when prices are high, which can effectively mitigate the impact of market volatility on the overall cost basis of their holdings. Furthermore, DRIPs facilitate the compounding of returns, as the newly acquired shares become eligible for future dividend payments, potentially accelerating the growth of the investment portfolio over time. Many corporations and brokerage firms facilitate these plans, often providing the service at little or no transaction cost to the investor.

This way, the investor is guaranteed the return of whatever the dividend yield is, but he or she is also subject to market risk due to the price fluctuations of the stock.

== Acquiring stock ==
The majority of plans require the potential investor to become a registered shareholder, as opposed to a beneficial shareholder. Registered shareholders are direct owners of company stock and are listed with a company's transfer agent, whereas beneficial shareholders hold their stock through a proxy, such as a brokerage account or an investment dealer. In the past, this meant having to keep stock certificates as proof of ownership, but now most plans are in paperless, "book-entry" format. In Canada, you must start a DRIP with a certificate and, as such, Canadian enrollees must have the share certificates to do so. All subsequent shares acquired through the DRIP or SPP would be in "book-entry" format.

In addition, certain DRIPs offer (with SEC approval in the US) a direct enrollment option, in which the initial share purchase may itself be made through the DRIP, thereby avoiding retail brokerage fees and commissions. This option is often called a "direct stock purchase plan" (DSPP). DRIP expert Charles Carlson has dubbed such plans "no-load stocks". However, describing such plans as "no-load stock" plans is extremely misleading. In the mid-1990s, when investing through company-sponsored plans became more popular, such "no-load" plans were created and promoted by certain transfer agents in order to create fees each time an investment is made through the plan (and, in many cases, for each dividend reinvestment). Traditional DRIPs, those available only to those who are already shareholders, are more likely to be "no-fee" plans. There are many no-fee versions of DRIPs, SPPs and DSPPs which are an efficient way to build holdings over time by making small regular investments on a dollar-cost averaging basis.

In some DRIPs, the investor has the option of receiving some or all dividends by check, as opposed to full reinvestment. Also, if a DRIP is discontinued, the investor's shares typically continue to be held in book-entry form, either including fractional shares or with a refund check issued for the fractional part of the position.

A downside of using DRIPs is that the investor must keep track of cost basis for many small purchases of stock, and maintain records of these purchases in paper or electronic form. This assures that the investor can accurately calculate the capital gains tax when any shares are sold, and document cost basis to their government if requested. This record keeping can become burdensome (or costly, if done by an accountant) if the investor participates in more than one DRIP for many years. For example, participating in 15 DRIPs for ten years, with all of the stocks paying quarterly dividends, would result in at least 615 share lots to keep track of—the 15 initial purchases, plus 600 reinvested dividends. Further complications arise if the investor periodically buys or sells shares, or if the company is involved in an event requiring adjustments to cost basis, such as a spin-off or a merger.

While the term "DRIP" is usually associated with company-sponsored plans, reinvestment of stock dividends is also available at no cost through some brokerage firms. This is called a synthetic DRIP. The drawback to broker DRIPs is that they do not allow for optional cash purchases. If the investor wants to acquire additional shares, he or she must pay a commission for each subsequent purchase.
