= Jobs and Growth Tax Relief Reconciliation Act of 2003 =

"JGTRRA"

- Long title: An act to provide for reconciliation pursuant to section 201 of the concurrent resolution on the budget for fiscal year 2004.
- Acronyms (colloquial): JGTRRA
- Enacted by: the 108th United States Congress

Citations
- Public law: Pub. L. 108–27 (text) (PDF)
- Statutes at Large: 117 Stat. 752

Legislative history
- Introduced in the House as H.R. 2 by Bill Thomas (R-CA) on February 27, 2003; Committee consideration by House Ways and Means; Passed the House on May 9, 2003 (222–203); Passed the Senate on May 15, 2003 (51-49); Reported by the joint conference committee on May 23, 2003; agreed to by the House on May 23, 2003 (231–200) and by the Senate on May 23, 2003 (50–50, the Vice President voted in the Affirmative); Signed into law by President George W. Bush on May 28, 2003

Major amendments
- Tax Relief, Unemployment Insurance Reauthorization, and Job Creation Act of 2010

The Jobs and Growth Tax Relief Reconciliation Act of 2003 ("JGTRRA", Pub. L. 108–27 (text) (PDF), 117 Stat. 752), was passed by the United States Congress on May 23, 2003, and signed into law by President George W. Bush on May 28, 2003. Nearly all of the cuts (individual rates, capital gains, dividends, estate tax) were set to expire after 2010.

Among other provisions, the act accelerated certain tax changes passed in the Economic Growth and Tax Relief Reconciliation Act of 2001, increased the exemption amount for the individual Alternative Minimum Tax, and lowered taxes of income from dividends and capital gains. The 2001 and 2003 acts are known together as the "Bush tax cuts".

== Description of cuts ==
The JGTRRA continued on the precedent established by the 2001 EGTRRA, while increasing tax reductions on investment income from dividends and capital gains.

=== Accelerated credits and rate reductions ===
The JGTRRA accelerated the gradual rate reduction and increase in credits passed in the EGTRRA. The maximum tax rate decreases originally scheduled to be phased into effect in 2006 under the EGTRRA were retroactively enacted to apply to the 2003 tax year. Also, the child tax credit was increased to what would have been the 2010 level, and "marriage penalty" relief was accelerated to 2009 levels. In addition, the threshold at which the alternative minimum tax applies was also increased.

=== Investments ===
The JGTRRA increased both the percentage rate at which items can be depreciated and the amount a taxpayer may choose to expense under Section 179, allowing them to deduct the full cost of the item from their income without having to depreciate the amount.

In addition, the capital gains tax decreased from rates of 8%, 10%, and 20% to 5% and 15%. Capital gains taxes for those currently paying 5% (in this instance, those in the 10% and 15% income tax brackets) are scheduled to be eliminated in 2008. However, capital gains taxes remain at the regular income tax rate for property held less than one year.

Certain categories, such as collectibles, remained taxed at existing rates, with a 28% cap. In addition, taxes on "qualified dividends" were reduced to the capital gains levels. "Qualified dividends" includes most income from non-foreign corporations, real estate investment trusts, and credit union and bank "dividends" that are nominally interest.

== Legislative history ==
Final House vote:

Vote by Party	Yea		Nay	
Republicans	224	99.6%	1	0.4%
Democrats	7	3.4%	198	96.6%
Independents	0	0.0%	1	100%
Total	231	53.6%	200	46.4%
Not voting	4		0	

Final Senate vote:

Vote by party	Yea	Nay
Republicans	48	3
Democrats	2	46
Independents	0	1
Total	50	50
Vice President Dick Cheney (R): Yea

== Tax bracket comparison ==
The tax cuts enacted by this legislation were retroactive to January 1, 2003, and first applied to taxes filed for the 2003 tax year. These individual rate reductions were scheduled to sunset on January 1, 2011, along with the Economic Growth and Tax Relief Reconciliation Act of 2001 unless further legislation was enacted to extend or make permanent its changes. This comparison shows how the ordinary taxable income brackets for each filing status were changed.

=== Single ===
Tax Year 2002		Tax Year 2003	
Income level	Tax rate	Income level	Tax rate
up to $6,000	10%	up to $7,000	10%
$6,000 - $27,950	15%	$7,000 - $28,400	15%
$27,950 - $67,700	27%	$28,400 - $68,800	25%
$67,700 - $141,250	30%	$68,800 - $143,500	28%
$141,250 - $307,050	35%	$143,500 - $311,950	33%
over $307,050	38.6%	over $311,950	35%

=== Married filing jointly or qualifying widow or widower ===
Tax Year 2002		Tax Year 2003	
Income level	Tax rate	Income level	Tax rate
up to $12,000	10%	up to $14,000	10%
$12,000 - $46,700	15%	$14,000 - $56,800	15%
$46,700 - $112,850	27%	$56,800 - $114,650	25%
$112,850 - $171,950	30%	$114,650 - $174,700	28%
$171,950 - $307,050	35%	$174,700 - $311,950	33%
over $307,050	38.6%	over $311,950	35%

=== Married filing separately ===
Tax Year 2002		Tax Year 2003	
Income level	Tax rate	Income level	Tax rate
up to $6,000	10%	up to $7,000	10%
$6,000 - $23,350	15%	$7,000 - $28,400	15%
$23,350 - $56,425	27%	$28,400 - $57,325	25%
$56,425 - $85,975	30%	$57,325 - $87,350	28%
$85,975 - $153,525	35%	$87,350 - $155,975	33%
over $153,525	38.6%	over $155,975	35%

=== Head of household ===
Tax Year 2002		Tax Year 2003	
Income level	Tax rate	Income level	Tax rate
up to $10,000	10%	up to $10,000	10%
$10,000 - $37,450	15%	$10,000 - $38,050	15%
$37,450 - $96,700	27%	$38,050 - $98,250	25%
$96,700 - $156,600	30%	$98,250 - $159,100	28%
$156,600 - $307,050	35%	$159,100 - $311,950	33%
over $307,050	38.6%	over $311,950	35%

== See also ==
- Taxation in the United States
- Starve the beast – Post 1970s taxation/budget policy
