= Ordinary income =

Type of income

Under the United States Internal Revenue Code, the type of income is defined by its character. Ordinary income is usually characterized as income other than long-term capital gains. Ordinary income can consist of income from wages, salaries, tips, commissions, bonuses, and other types of compensation from employment, interest, dividends, or net income from a sole proprietorship, partnership or LLC. Rents and royalties, after certain deductions, depreciation or depletion allowances, and gambling winnings are also treated as ordinary income. A "short term capital gain", or gain on the sale of an asset held for less than one year of the capital gains holding period, is taxed as ordinary income.

Ordinary income stands in contrast to capital gain, which is defined as gain from the sale or exchange of a capital asset. A personal residence is a capital asset to the homeowner. By contrast, a land developer who had many houses for sale on many lots would treat each of those lots (and homes) as inventory when they are sold. For the developer, each lot and home would not be a capital asset. Similarly, clothing held by a retail store for sale in the ordinary course of business would be inventory -- and not a capital asset -- for the store.

Another case where income is not taxed as ordinary income is the case of qualified dividends. The general rule taxes dividends as ordinary income. A change allowing use of the same tax rates as is used for long term capital gains rates for qualified dividends was made with the Jobs and Growth Tax Relief Reconciliation Act of 2003. Qualified dividends are dividends paid by domestic corporations or by corporations from foreign countries that have a tax treaty with the United States. This rule applies under the condition that the corporation has included the dividends in its own taxable income. Thus pass-through corporations like REITs and REMICs would not distribute qualified dividends, and the dividends from those entities would be taxed at the ordinary income rates.

== Rates ==
In the United States, ordinary income is taxed at the marginal tax rates. As of 2006, there are six "tax brackets" ranging from 10% to 35%. Ordinary income is taxed within the particular tax bracket listed on the rate schedules or tax tables as a percentage for each dollar within that bracket. However, after the 2003 Tax Cut, qualified dividends and long-term capital gains are taxed at the same rate of 15% (up to 20% after 2012).

== See also ==
- Internal Revenue Service
- Taxation in the United States
