= Dividend units =

In finance, a dividend unit is the right to receive payments equal to actual dividends paid on a share or a stock. A dividend unit can be granted for a term, for example 20 years from the date of grant.

In the United States, dividend units are sometimes offered to employees as part of their retirement plan.
