= Tax Increase Prevention and Reconciliation Act of 2005 =

- Long title: To provide for reconciliation pursuant to section 201(b) of the concurrent resolution on the budget for fiscal year 2006.
- Acronyms (colloquial): TIPRA
- Enacted by: the 109th United States Congress

Citations
- Public law: Pub. L. 109–222 (text) (PDF)

Legislative history
- Introduced in the House as H.R. 4297 by Bill Thomas (R‑CA 22nd) on November 10, 2005; Committee consideration by House Ways and Means; Passed the House on December 8, 2005 (234–197); Passed the Senate on February 2, 2006 (66–31); Reported by the joint conference committee on March 15, 2006; agreed to by the House on May 10, 2006 (244–185) and by the Senate on May 11, 2006 (54–44); Signed into law by President George W. Bush on May 17, 2006; 20 years ago

The Tax Increase Prevention and Reconciliation Act of 2005 (or TIPRA, Pub. L. 109–222 (text) (PDF), 120 Stat. 345) is an American law, which was enacted on May 17, 2006.

This bill prevents several tax provisions from sunsetting in the near future. The two most notable pieces of the bill are the extension of the reduced tax rates on capital gains and dividends and extension of the alternative minimum tax (AMT) tax reduction.

== Legislative history ==
The U.S. House of Representatives approved the bill as H.R. 4297, 244–185, and the U.S. Senate approved it 54-44, largely along party lines, with most Republicans supporting and most Democrats opposing.

== Excerpts from Detailed Summary of Conference Report ==
=== Two-Year Extension of Reduced Rates on Capital Gains and Dividends ===
Under current law, long-term capital gains and dividend income are taxed at a maximum rate of 15 percent through 2008. For taxpayers in the 10 and 15 percent tax brackets, the tax rate is 5 percent through 2007 and zero in 2008. The Conference Report extends the rates effective in 2008 through 2010. Without action, these rates would have increased after 2008.

=== Alternative Minimum Tax Relief ===
==== Increase in AMT Exemption Levels ====
The provision extends the Alternative Minimum Tax (AMT) exemption levels through the end of 2006 at a higher level than in 2005. The new exemption levels for 2006 are $62,550 for joint filers, $42,500 for single filers and $31,275 for separate filers.

==== AMT Relief for Non-Refundable Personal Tax Credits ====
The tax code includes many non-refundable personal tax credits, such as the dependent care credit and the credit for the elderly and disabled, among others. Claiming these credits may push an individual in the AMT. The provision extends current law which allows most non-refundable personal tax credits to be claimed against the AMT so that families continue to receive the full benefit of these tax credits.

=== Extension and Modification of Certain Provisions ===
==== Two-Year Extension of Enhanced Section 179 Expensing for Small Business ====
Under current law, small businesses may expense up to $100,000 of investments in depreciable assets. The deduction phases out dollar-for dollar to the extent the business's annual investments exceed $400,000. Without action, the expensing limit would have declined to $25,000 and the phase-out threshold would decline to $200,000 after 2007.

==== Subpart F ====
Subpart F of the tax code taxes U.S. shareholders of foreign companies (controlled foreign corporations or CFCs) as if certain types of income of the foreign company was paid as a dividend back to the shareholder, even though no dividend actually occurred and nothing was actually brought back to the United States. One provision extends an existing exception from Subpart F for active financing income for two years. A second provision provides a "CFC look-through" rule exception from Subpart F for cross-border payments of dividends, interest, rents, and royalties that are funded with active income that has not been repatriated. This "CFC look-through" rule will be effective for taxable years beginning after December 31, 2005 and before January 1, 2009.

=== Other Provisions ===
==== Simplification of Active Trade or Business Test ====
The provision simplifies the application of the active trade or business test to certain corporate distributions. By applying this test on an affiliated group basis, the provision applies the same standard regardless of whether a business is owned by a holding company or owned directly. As a result, the provision allows corporations to avoid costly and inefficient internal restructurings prior to engaging in certain corporate distributions to their shareholders.

==== Tax Treatment of Self-Created Musical Works ====
The provision provides capital gains treatment for self-created musical works when these works are sold by the artist. Under current law, such sales are taxed as ordinary income.

==== Amortization for Songwriters ====
The provision allows taxpayers to elect to amortize the costs of creating or acquiring a musical composition over five years. This election would be made in lieu of the income forecast method for these advances.

==== Loans to Qualified Continuing Care Facilities ====
The provision reforms the tax treatment of loans to continuing care facilities.

=== Corporate Estimated Tax Provisions ===
The timing of certain corporate estimated tax installment payments has been changed.

=== Revenue Offset Provisions ===
==== Application of Earnings Stripping Rules to C Corporations Which are Partners ====
The provision codifies proposed Treasury regulations attributing partnership interest income, interest expense and liabilities to corporate partners for purposes of applying the earning stripping rules.

==== Amend Information Reporting Requirements to Include Interest on Tax-Exempt Bonds ====
The provision provides that interest paid on tax-exempt bonds is subject to information reporting in the same manner as interest paid on taxable obligations.

==== Amortization of Geological and Geophysical Expenditures for Major Integrated Oil & Gas Companies ====
The provision replaces two-year amortization treatment for certain expenditures made by major integrated oil companies with five-year amortization treatment.

==== Limitation on Certain Corporate "Cash Rich" Spin-Off Transactions ====
The provision denies tax-free treatment to certain spin-offs where either the distributing corporation or the controlled corporation is a "disqualified investment corporation", defined as having investment assets that are two-thirds or more (75 percent or more under a first-year transition rule) or the value of the corporation's total assets.

==== Offers-In-Compromise Partial Payments ====
The provision requires that a taxpayer make a good faith down payment of 20 percent of any lump sum offer-in-compromise with any application for an offer. For periodic payment offers, the taxpayer is required to comply with their own payment schedule while the offer is being considered. The provision also provides that an offer is deemed accepted if the IRS does not make a decision with respect to the offer within two years from the date that the offer was submitted.

==== Taxation of Passive Income of Minors ====
Under current law, minors under age 14 are taxed on their unearned income (i.e. passive income such as interest) at their parent's marginal tax rate. The provision increases the age of minors subject to this tax to those minors under age 18. The provision also provides an exception for distributions from certain qualified disability trusts.

==== Conversions to Roth IRAs ====
The provision allows more taxpayers to convert from Traditional IRA to Roth IRA by removing the modified adjusted gross income (MAGI) limitation on such rollovers starting in 2010. Taxpayers who convert in 2010 may, as a special case, elect to pay tax on amounts converted in equal installments in 2011 and 2012.

==== Domestic Manufacturing Deduction Wage Limitation ====
The domestic manufacturing deduction for a taxable year is limited to 50 percent of the wages by the taxpayer during the calendar year that ends in such taxable year. The provision clarifies that only wages allocable to domestic production gross receipts are included for purposes of this limitation.

==== Changes to Foreign Earned Income Exclusion (26 U.S.C. § 911) ====
The provision increases the Foreign Earned Income Exclusion (FEIE) and advances the inflation-adjustment provision that was set to begin in 2008. However, the Act also includes a "stacking provision" that requires the FEIE to be excluded against the lowest tax brackets first.

Additionally, the Act limits the related Foreign Housing Exclusion to a figure based on the excess of 16% of the value of the FEIE, with a cap of 30% of the value of the exclusion. (Previously, the figure was the excess of 16% of the salary of a federal worker grade G-14 Step 1, with no cap.) The Treasury was given authority to adjust this exclusion amount depending on cost-of-living factors in differing world metropolises.

== Criticism ==
The TIPRA has been criticised by commentators and Democratic congressional representatives for providing what these critics believe are tax cuts only for the wealthy and corporations, doing little for low- and middle-income citizens and further increasing the federal budget deficit.

Additionally, the Act imposed a retroactive tax increase on unearned income of many Americans living abroad who claimed the Foreign Earned Income Exclusion. This increase is amplified by the rapid decline of the dollar against most major foreign currencies which has decoupled the relationship between tax rate and real earnings (i.e. Americans abroad can expect increases in overall tax even if there are no increases to their real income in local currency).

A provision amending the Internal Revenue Code of 1986 imposed of 3 percent withholding on certain payments made to vendors by government entities, starting on January 1, 2011. This implementation was pushed back to January 1, 2013. It was almost immediately criticized, and in October, 2011 the House passed HR 674 to repeal the provision entirely.
