= Share repurchase =

Reacquisition by a company of its own shares

Share repurchase, also known as share buyback or stock buyback, is the reacquisition by a company of its own shares. It is an alternative way of returning money to shareholders than dividends. After a repurchase event, the company's stock price is now proportionally higher because of the smaller number of shares outstanding. Repurchases allow stockholders to potentially reduce taxes, by paying the usually lower capital gains tax when the shareholder chooses to sell the stock rather than the higher ordinary income tax rate that must be paid when the dividends are distributed.

In most countries, a corporation can repurchase its own stock by distributing cash to existing shareholders in exchange for a fraction of the company's outstanding equity; that is, cash is exchanged for a reduction in the number of shares outstanding. The company either retires the repurchased shares or keeps them as treasury stock, available for reissuance.

Under U.S. corporate law, there are six primary methods of stock repurchase: open market, private negotiations, repurchase "put" rights, two variants of self-tender repurchase (a fixed price tender offer and a Dutch auction), and accelerate repurchases. More than 95% of the buyback programs worldwide are through an open-market method, whereby the company announces the buyback program and then repurchases shares in the open market (stock exchange). In the late 20th and the early 21st century, there was a sharp rise in the volume of share repurchases in the United States. Large share repurchases started later in Europe than in the United States, but are nowadays a common practice around the world.

U.S. Securities and Exchange Commission (SEC) rule 10b-18 sets requirements for stock repurchase in the United States. Rule 10b-18 provides a voluntary "safe harbor" from liability for market manipulation under Sections 9(a)(2) and 10(b) of the Securities Exchange Act of 1934.

== Purpose ==
Companies typically have two uses for profits. Firstly, some part of profits can be distributed to shareholders in the form of dividends or stock repurchases. The remainder of profits are retained earnings, kept inside the company and used for investing in the future of the company, if profitable ventures for reinvestment of retained earnings can be identified. However, sometimes companies may find that some or all of their retained earnings cannot be reinvested to produce acceptable returns.

Share repurchases are an alternative to dividends. When a company repurchases its own shares, it reduces the number of shares held by the public. The reduction of the float, or publicly traded shares, means that even if profits remain the same, the earnings per share increase.

Repurchases allow stockholders to delay taxes which they would have been required to pay on dividends in the year the dividends are paid, to instead pay taxes on the capital gains they receive when they sell the stock, whose price is now higher because of the smaller number of shares outstanding.

Aside from paying out free cash flow, repurchases may also be used to signal and/or take advantage of undervaluation. If a firm's manager believes their firm's stock is currently trading below its intrinsic value, they may consider repurchases. An open market repurchase, whereby no premium is paid on top of current market price, offers a potentially profitable investment for the manager. That is, they may repurchase the currently undervalued shares, wait for the market to correct the undervaluation whereby prices increase to the intrinsic value of the equity, and re-issue them at a profit. Alternatively, they may undertake a fixed price tender offer, whereby a premium is often offered over current market price; this sends a strong signal to the market that they believe that the firm's equity is undervalued, which is proven by their willingness to pay above market price to repurchase the shares. However, scholars also suggest that repurchases sometimes might be a cheap talk and convey a misleading signal due to the flexibility of repurchases.

Share repurchases avoid the accumulation of excessive amounts of cash in the corporation. Companies with strong cash generation and limited needs for capital spending will accumulate cash on the balance sheet, which makes the company a more attractive target for takeover, since the cash can be used to pay down the debt incurred to carry out the acquisition. Anti-takeover strategies, therefore, often include maintaining a lean cash position and share repurchases bolster the stock price, making a takeover more expensive.

Compared to dividends (a reduction of which is viewed more negatively by the market than a reduction in share buybacks), repurchases are perceived as more flexible and seem to be used to distribute cash flows which may not be sustained. Bank holding companies were found to hedge less if share repurchases comprised a greater proportion of their total payout.

== Methods ==
=== Open market ===
The most common share repurchase method in the United States is the open-market stock repurchase, representing almost 95% of all repurchases. A firm will announce that it will repurchase some shares in the open market from time to time as market conditions dictate and maintains the option of deciding whether, when, and how much to repurchase. Open-market repurchases can span months or even years. There are, however, daily buyback limits which restrict the amount of stock that can be bought over a particular time interval again ranging from months to even years. According to SEC Rule 10b-18, the issuer cannot purchase more than 25% of the average daily volume.

=== Accelerated Share Repurchase (ASR) ===
An accelerated share repurchase (ASR) is a share buyback strategy where a company repurchases a large chunk of its publicly traded equity shares. Companies rely on specialized investment banks to effectuate the transaction. In a typical ASR transaction, the company delivers the cash up front to the investment bank and enters into a forward contract to have its shares delivered at specified future date, adhering to regulations. Subsequently, the bank, borrows shares of the company, and delivers those shares back to the company. Companies often engage in accelerated share repurchase (ASR) programs, if they have certain convictions about the intrinsic valuation of the company or if they have commitments of capital return to shareholders.

=== Fixed-price tender ===
Prior to 1981, all tender offer repurchases were executed using a fixed-price tender offer. This offer specifies in advance a single purchase price, the number of shares sought, and the duration of the offer, with public disclosure required. The offer may be made conditional upon receiving tenders of a minimum number of shares, and it may permit withdrawal of tendered shares prior to the offer's expiration date. Shareholders decide whether or not to participate, and if so, the number of shares to tender to the firm at the specified price. Frequently, officers and directors are precluded from participating in tender offers. If the number of shares tendered exceeds the number sought, then the company purchases less than all shares tendered at the purchase price on a pro rata basis to all who tendered at the purchase price. If the number of shares tendered is below the number sought, the company may choose to extend the offer's expiration date.

=== Dutch auction ===
The introduction of the Dutch auction share repurchase in 1981 allows an alternative form of tender offer. A Dutch auction offer specifies a price range within which the shares will ultimately be purchased. Shareholders are invited to tender their stock, if they desire, at any price within the stated range. The firm then compiles these responses, creating a demand curve for the stock. The purchase price is the lowest price that allows the firm to buy the number of shares sought in the offer, and the firm pays that price to all investors who tendered at or below that price. If the number of shares tendered exceeds the number sought, then the company purchases less than all shares tendered at or below the purchase price on a pro rata basis to all who tendered at or below the purchase price. If too few shares are tendered, then the firm either cancels the offer (provided it had been made conditional on a minimum acceptance), or it buys back all tendered shares at the maximum price.

The first firm to use the Dutch auction was Todd Shipyards in 1981.

== Types ==
=== Selective buybacks ===
In broad terms, a selective buyback is one in which identical offers are not made to every shareholder, for example, if offers are made to only some of the shareholders in the company. In the United States, no special shareholder approval of a selective buyback is required. In the UK, however, the scheme must first be approved by all shareholders, or by a special resolution (requiring a 75% majority) of the members in which no vote is cast by selling shareholders or their associates. Selling shareholders may not vote in favor of a special resolution to approve a selective buyback. The notice to shareholders convening the meeting to vote on a selective buyback must include a statement setting out all material information that is relevant to the proposal, although it is not necessary for the company to provide information already disclosed to the shareholders, if that would be unreasonable.

=== Other types ===
A company may also buy back shares held by or for employees or salaried directors of the company or a related company. This type of buyback, referred to as an "employee share scheme buyback", requires an ordinary resolution. A listed company may also buy back its shares in on-market trading on the stock exchange, following the passing of an ordinary resolution if over the 10/12 limit. The stock exchange's rules apply to "on-market buybacks". A listed company may also buy unmarketable parcels of shares from shareholders (called a "minimum holding buyback"). This does not require a resolution but the purchased shares must still be canceled.

== Economic impact ==
Repurchases account for a small fraction of the trading volume in a typical stock, making their price impact too small to generate short-term price manipulation. The short-term price increase after buybacks is modest and does not reverse on average.

== Criticism ==
Academic research highlights the potential for the misuse of share repurchases, for instance to satisfy greenmail, to manipulate executive compensation, and in the case of open-market repurchases (the authorization of which does not actually require the company to repurchase shares), to send false signals to mislead investors.

Executive compensation is often affected by share buybacks. Part of their rewards may be tied to targets on share price or earnings per share. Due to the reduction of the number of shares, the share price increases more than the market capitalization of the company. Share repurchases have been criticized for causing misaligned incentives between total shareholder value and executive compensation. In a similar vein, share buybacks can be used to avoid dividends' reduction of the ex-dividend share price, where this metric is used to determine compensation. Where repurchases are more tax-efficient for executives who own stock than dividends are, they are more likely to be chosen over paying dividends. Corporate executives are more likely to sell their stock shortly after a repurchase program has been announced.

Share repurchases have been critically evaluated since the 1970s when the Securities and Exchange Commission ascertained "that a large volume of stock buybacks would manipulate the market". Rule 10b-18 has been criticized for leaving stock repurchases "virtually unregulated".

According to Lenore Palladino, an economist at the Roosevelt Institute, stock buyback programs are "one of the drivers of our imbalanced economy, in which corporate profits and shareholder payments continue to grow while wages for typical workers stay flat".

It has been argued that share buybacks can harm a company by leading to more capital expenditure on buybacks than R&D, thus hampering innovation. From July 1999 at the start of Carly Fiorina's tenure to 2011 at the end of Leo Apotheker's tenure, HP spent $67 billion on stock buybacks, even as HP's business performance was mixed and innovation largely vanished.

== Bibliography ==
- Chen, Alvin; Obizhaeva, Olga A. (2022). Stock Buyback Motivations and Consequences: a Literature Review (PDF). CFA Institute Research Foundation. ISBN 978-1-952927-26-3.
