= Liquidating distribution =

A liquidating distribution (or liquidating dividend) is a type of nondividend distribution made by a corporation or a partnership to its shareholders during its partial or complete liquidation. Liquidating distributions are not paid solely out of the profits of the corporation. Instead, the entire amount of shareholders' equity is distributed. When a company has more liabilities than assets, equity is negative and no liquidating distribution is made at all. This is usually the case in bankruptcy liquidations. Creditors are always senior to shareholders in receiving the corporation's assets upon winding up. However, in case all debts to creditors have been fully satisfied, there is a surplus left to divide among equity-holders. This mainly occurs during voluntary liquidations of solvent corporations.

== Cases ==
A dividend may be referred to as liquidating dividend when a company:

1. Goes out of business and the net assets of the company (after all liabilities have been paid) are distributed to shareholders, or
2. Sells a portion of its business for cash and the proceeds are distributed to shareholders.

Liquidating distributions can be viewed as a form of return of capital, in that the capital invested in the corporation by its owners is returned to them, rather than only the earnings.

== See also ==
- Dividend tax
- Liquidation
- Shareholders' equity
- Special dividend
