= Eugene L. Grant =

American civil engineer and educator

- Born: February 15, 1897; Chicago, Illinois
- Died: July 9, 1996 (aged 99)
- Citizenship: USA
- Known for: Engineering Economy (First published in 1930)
- Scientific career
- Fields: civil engineering

Eugene Lodewick Grant (February 15, 1897 – July 9, 1996), was an American civil engineer and educator. He graduated with a BS from the University of Wisconsin in 1917. He started teaching in 1920 at Montana State University and then in 1930 at the School of Engineering, Stanford University where he taught until 1962. He is known for his work in Engineering Economics with his textbook first published in 1930. Grant was the intellectual heir of work performed by John Charles Lounsbury Fish who published Engineering Economics: First Principles in 1923, providing the critical bridge between Grant and the pioneering effort of Arthur M. Wellington in his engineering economics work of the 1870s.

Grant was awarded many academic and professional honors such as an honorary doctorate in civil engineering at Montana State University; Fellow of the American Statistical Association, American Society for Quality(ASQ) and the American Association for the Advancement of Science as well as membership in the National Academy of Engineering in 1987. He was part of the effort to found the American Society for Quality which awarded Grant its top award, the Shewhart Medal in 1952. In 1967, ASQ created the E.L. Grant Award which is granted annually to the individual who has been deemed to have demonstrated outstanding leadership in the areas of educational programs in quality. Joseph Juran said that Grant was a "quiet doer who didn't receive enough credit for what he did" and did much to advance the field of quality to what it was in the middle of the 20th century.

== Early life and career ==
Eugene Lodewick Grant was born on February 15, 1897, in Chicago, Illinois, to Bertrand Eugene and Eva May (Lodewick). In 1923, he married Mildred Brooks Livingston and they had one child, Nancy Livingston. He attended University of Wisconsin and graduated in 1917 with a Bachelor of Science in civil engineering. Grant saw wartime service in the United States Navy and then later served in the Geological Survey. Grant then joined the civil engineering faculty at the University of Montana (Bozeman) in 1920. He earned a master's degree in economics at Columbia University in 1928.

=== Stanford University civil engineering department ===
Grant joined the department in 1930 which was headed at the time by fellow engineering economist John Charles Lounsbury Fish where Grant started on his landmark textbook on engineering economy. He later became chair of the civil engineering department in 1947. He headed that from 1947 to 1956 while at the same time heading the Committee on Industrial Engineering which later became an independent engineering program at Stanford.

==== Principles of Engineering Economy ====
Following the pioneering work of Fish, Grant published his text on engineering economy with the first edition printed in 1930. Grant improved on Fish's work by presenting methods for short-run analyses complementing the long run methods championed by Fish and A. M. Wellington in their earlier works. The book was grouped into three parts: "The Arithmetic of Engineering Economy," "Fact Finding in Economy Studies," and "Background for Economy Studies." Initial reviews of his book noted that Grant's work addressed "... the difficulties in reducing costs and income in different periods to a comparable basis-difficulties which are too commonly neglected by economists." Grant succeeded in making economics "realistic,... an unusually good combination of text and case material." Other reviewers noted that his book was very useful for the study of public utilities in its treatment of the "... cost problems of public service industries (such as) the economies of maximum capacity,... The most advantageous load, plant, and capacity factors ..."

In 1938, Grant published the 2nd edition of his book. He reorganized the book into four parts, Planning Economy Studies to Solve Engineering Problems, Interest—The Time Element in Economy, Techniques for Economy Studies and Getting Results from Economy Studies. Grant noted in his preface to the 2nd edition that his book emphasized two points as its core themes:

- "It is prospective differences between alternatives which are relevant to their comparison.
- The fundamental question regarding a proposed investment in (physical) plant is whether it is likely to be recovered plus a return commensurate with the risk. The purpose of calculations which involve the time value of money should be to answer this question."

One reviewer of this 2nd edition noted that Grant's work was important and represented a specialized analytical approach to address the special problem of choosing alternatives. It helped that Grant's work avoided "involved mathematics".

Over the next fifty years, six more editions would be printed with the last, the 8th, printed in 1990. In 1982, the Accounting Historians Journal in an article on the historical development of traditional net present value (NPV) method with the equivalent annual cost (EAC) methods noted that the role that Grant's book on engineering economy played in the development of discounted cash flow techniques. Jones, et al. noted that this development intersected the "... fields of engineering, economics, and accounting".

"Grant discussed applications of the present worth, the rate of return, and the equivalent annual cost methods for making capital budgeting decisions. Each of these methods is widely used today, and Grant has been recognized for the initial presentation of these methods in a single textbook."

===== Equivalence =====
Grant introduced the concept of economic equivalence in his first edition of the Principles book noting that "... (a)n "equivalent" figure is one which is convertible into a given figure by the application of the proper compound interest factor. Thus the notion of equivalence requires the assumption of an interest rate." Grant looked at interest as an economic sacrifice in order to determine whether or not to make the investment. He noted that accounting systems never included "... interest on the ownership capital as a cost; interest is only a cost when it is paid out."

In his revised 2nd edition, he added a whole chapter devoted to the subject defining economic equivalence as the concept that investments or payments which differ in total magnitude and made at different dates may be substituted for each other to make a fair comparison in economic studies. As Grant noted in his first edition, this required a broader definition of interest that used in accounting.

==== Basic Accounting and Cost Accounting ====
In 1956, Grant published Basic Accounting and Cost Accounting as a text for introductory courses for nonaccounting majors and intended for those persons who weren't professional accountants. Grant argued in the book that accounting should be viewed as a prerequisite for good citizenship. Grant's approach was to involve the student "... deeply in the mechanics of record keeping and the accounting process....(as opposed to newer ones that) ... puts more stress on the uses of accounting information than on its synthesis." The book was grouped into three parts: "Accounting Fundamentals," "Elements of Cost Accounting," and "Some Accounting Topics." In the later part, Grant wrote a chapter entitled "Some hazards in the uncritical use of accounting figures" in which he articulated some general principles on making decisions in business; arguing that fundamentally, business decisions are between "... alternative courses of action." Critical to this process was developing "... a clear definition of the alternatives to be considered." Grant argued that the rational basis for such business decision-making was an ability to "... predict the consequences of choosing among the various alternatives...and it is only prospective differences among those alternatives that influence the choice...(all other matters)...are irrelevant." Where "... probable consequences of proposed alternatives ..." were expressed in terms of money, namely "relevant costs". Crucially, Grant noted that in such business decision-making, all relevant differences in terms of cost are future ones as past events cannot be "changed by a decision made today." Lastly, Grant argued that no rational business decision regarding the "proposed investments of money could be made without recognizing the time value of money." Unlike accounting which doesn't recognize a cost unless money is borrowed, economics recognized this as an opportunity cost.

While one reviewer stated that "Mr. Grant has written a fine introduction to conventional accounting and cost principles for "non-accountants ..." another criticized Grant's use of "... accounting-cycle illustrations in so many chapters as focal points for introducing basic techniques ..." because it made for a difficult presentation for the students. This reviewer noted that Grant excluded classical accounting subjects such as "accounting systems, data processing, and internal control; assembling accounting data to aid managerial decision- making; internal and external auditing." In summary, the book was criticized as a "...condensation rather than a distillation of basic accounting and cost accounting principles and techniques ... (and) ... the use of long involved problems to illustrate fundamental principles combine to make the book an inefficient teaching and learning tool."

== Awards ==
- Thomas Fitch prize ASCE, (1944).
- ASQC Shewhart Medal (1952).
- The AIIE Founders Award (1965)
- Honorary Ph.D. in Civil Engineering from the University of Montana (1973)
- The IIE Engineering Economy Division's Wellington Award (1979)
- Membership in the National Academy of Engineering (1987)

== Personal life ==
Since 1966, Grant resided in Palo Alto, California. On July 9, 1996, Grant died at Channing House in Palo Alto, California. Grant was 99.

Grant is interred at Sunset Hills Cemetery Memorials in Bozeman, Gallatin County, Montana, USA. At the time, he was professor emeritus of economics of engineering in the department of industrial engineering at Stanford University. He was a recognized leader and pioneer in applying economic analysis to engineering problems. His work on statistical quality control was an integral part of the effort to improve production in industrial plants during World War II. A colleague of Grant's noted that:

"(Grant's) book was the first textbook on quality control, ... It is fascinating, in light of the intense interest in quality control [today], to go back and read [that] book. What one finds is Gene Grant knew in 1946 what most of U.S. industry discovered 40 years later."

== Partial bibliography ==
- The economic utilization of the waters of the Upper Missouri river (1928)
- Principles of engineering economy (1930)
- Principles of engineering economy: problems. New York: The Ronald Press Company. (1938)
- Statistical quality control (1946)
- Fundamentals of depreciation (1949)
- The problem of the isolated lot with Gerald J. Lieberman. (1955)
- Basic accounting and cost accounting (1956)
- The Comparison of alternatives with W. Grant Ireson (1970); part of Managerial economics and operations research; a nonmathematical introduction, edited by Mansfield, Edwin.
