= Trives =

Trives may refer to:

- A Pobra de Trives, municipality in Ourense (province) in the Galicia region of north-west Spain
- Samuel Trives (born 1972), Spanish handball player
- Sobrado, A Pobra de Trives (San Salvador), a parish in A Pobra de Trives municipality in Ourense in the Galicia region of north-west Spain
- Terra de Trives, comarca in the Galician Province of Ourense

== See also ==
- Trive Capital, an American private equity firm headquartered in Dallas, Texas
- Trivest, an American private equity firm based in Florida.
