= Manzaneda =

- Municipality
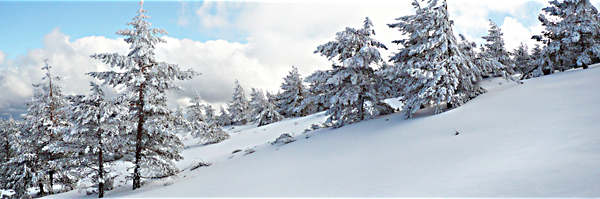
- Ski resort in Manzaneda.

- Coat of arms

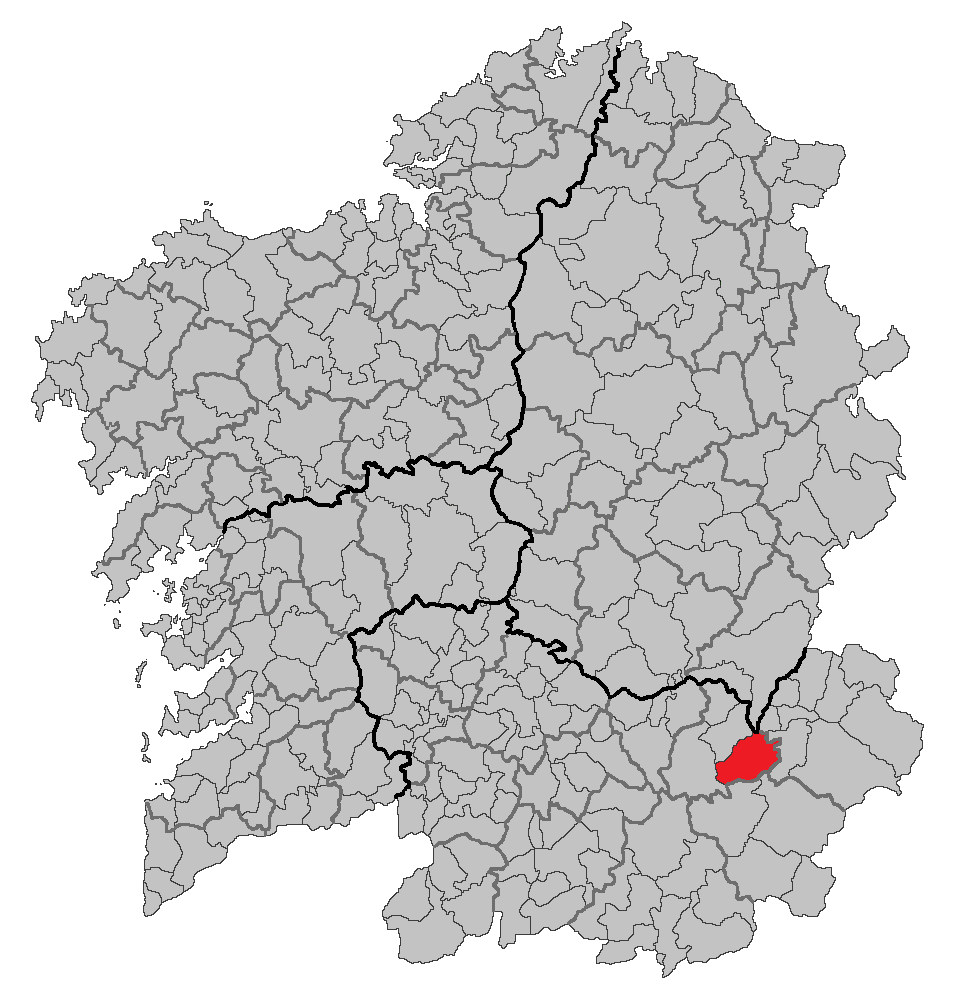
- Location in Galicia

- Location in Spain
- Coordinates: 42°18′34″N 7°14′00″W
- Country: Spain
- Autonomous community: Galicia
- Province: Ourense
- Comarca: Terra de Trives

Government
  - Mayor: Amable Fernández Basalo (PSdeG-PSOE)

Area
  - Total: 114.6 km^{2} (44.2 sq mi)
- Elevation: 657 m (2,156 ft)

Population (2025-01-01)
  - Total: 767
  - Density: 6.69/km^{2} (17.3/sq mi)
- Time zone: UTC+1 (CET)
  - Summer (DST): UTC+2 (CEST)
- Website: concellodemanzaneda.es/

Manzaneda is a municipality in the province of Ourense, in the autonomous community of Galicia, Spain. It belongs to the comarca of Terra de Trives. Its neighbor municipalities include A Pobra de Trives to the north, O Bolo to the east, Vilariño de Conso to the south and Chandrexa de Queixa to the west. In 2018 its population was 890.

Manzaneda is known for its medium sized ski resort.
