= Pobra =

Pobra may refer to:

- A Pobra de Trives, municipality in Ourense (province) in the Galicia region of north-west Spain
- A Pobra do Brollón, municipality in the Spanish province of Lugo
- A Pobra do Caramiñal, located in the entrance of a bay on the Galician coastline known as the "Ria de Arousa" in the Province of A Coruña
- Sobrado, A Pobra de Trives (San Salvador), parish in A Pobra de Trives municipality in Ourense in the Galicia region of north-west Spain
