= John Charles Lounsbury Fish =

- Born: June 3, 1870; Huron County, Ohio
- Died: June 15, 1962 (aged 92); Santa Monica, California
- Education: Cornell University
- Known for: Mathematics of the Paper Location of a Railroad (1905), Earthwork Haul and Overhaul: Including Economic Distribution (1913), Technic of Surveying Instruments and Methods (1917), Engineering Economics: First Principles... (1923), The Engineering Method (1950), Linear Drawing and Lettering for Beginners, Lettering of Working Drawings, Descriptive Geometry
- Scientific career
- Fields: civil engineering

John Charles Lounsbury Fish (June 3, 1870 - June 15, 1962) was a Professor of Civil Engineering, Emeritus, at the School of Engineering, Stanford University. He is known for his works Mathematics of the Paper Location of a Railroad (1905), Earthwork Haul and Overhaul: Including Economic Distribution (1913), Technique of Surveying Instruments and Methods (1917), Engineering Economics: First Principles... (1923), The Engineering Method (1950), Linear Drawing and Lettering for Beginners, Lettering of Working Drawings, and Descriptive Geometry, and also as a coauthor of Technic of Surveying Instruments and Methods (with Walter Loring Webb, 1917), The Transition Curve... (with Charles Lee Crandall), and The Engineering Profession (with Theodore Jesse Hoover, 1941).

Fish provided the critical bridge between the pioneering effort of Arthur M. Wellington in his engineering economics work of the 1870s and the first publication of the Principles of Engineering Economy in 1930 by Eugene L. Grant.

== Early life and career ==
John Charles Lounsbury Fish was born on June 3, 1870, in Erie County, Ohio, near Lake Erie to Job Fish (1828-1923) and Anna Elizabeth Peabody (1834-1904). He studied at Oberlin academy in 1886 and graduated as a civil engineer from Cornell University in 1892 and was an instructor for another year at that engineering school. In 1894, Fish married Ethelwyn L. Slaught (1867-1951) in LaPorte, Indiana. They had three children, Job (1895-1907) Lounsbury slaught (1899-1987) and Frances Cecelia (1901-1968). Their son Lounsbury was also to be a future Stanford University civil engineering graduate in 1921.

The USGS triangulation survey was for the primary control of topographic work. Fish worked on highlighted mountain peaks.

John Charles Lounsbury Fish died in Los Angeles, California on June 15, 1962.

=== Stanford University (1893-1935) ===
Fish left Cornell for Stanford University as an instructor in 1893. He became a professor of railroad engineering in 1909 and then of civil engineering in 1925 and civil engineering department chair for 1928-1935 when he retired as emeritus professor of civil engineering.

== Civil engineering practice ==
While Fish was largely an engineering educator, he worked on a variety of civil engineering projects. In 1891, he worked on the construction of the Sandusky and Columbus Short-Line railroad which opened in 1893. In 1899, Fish worked for the United States Coast and Geodetic Survey as part of its efforts to produce an accurate topographic map the State of California. Fish worked on the primary triangulation for San Jacinto Peak and Santiago Peak. In 1899 he would return to the USGS as a field engineer for exploratory surveys for reservoir and dam sites in Monterey County, California.

Fish also did railway work and from 1900 thru 1909 worked on the Lake Shore and Michigan Southern Railway; first as a resident engineer and then in 1907-09 as a division engineer.

== Bibliography ==
- Lettering of Working Drawings, New York: D. Van Nostrand Co., 1894.
- The Transition Curve: by offsets and by deflection angles.J. Wiley & sons, (1899)
- Mathematics of the Paper Location of a Railroad, (1905)
- Coordinates of elementary surveying. The author, 1909.
- Earth Work Haul and Overhaul Including Economic Distribution (1913)
- Engineering Economics, First Principles 1st edition, (1915) which was the leading text for the next 20 years. Fish completely rewrote the second edition in 1923 which proved to be more significant than his first.
- The Engineering Profession (1941)
- The Engineering Method (1950)

== Legacy ==
Fish was a lifelong member of the American society of civil engineers and the American railway engineering association.

=== Contributions to engineering economics ===
Fish's contributions to engineering economics in the form of his book Engineering Economics: First Principles (1915, 1923) provided the critical bridge between the pioneering effort of Arthur M. Wellington in his work of the 1870s on the Economic location of railways and Eugene L. Grant's work on Principles of Engineering Economy in the 1930s. Fish wrote that

"Every engineering structure, with few exceptions, is first suggested by economic requirements; and the design of every part, excepting few, and of the whole is finally judged from the economic standpoint. It is therefore apparent that the so-called principles of design are subordinate to the principles which underlie economic judgment."

Fish wrote his text based upon his belief that to the civil engineer, "... working knowledge of first principles is as essential in the economics as in the mechanics' of structures." He also acknowledged influences such as Wellington's Economic theory of railway location (1886); Waddell's DePontibus," Horatio Alvah Foster's (1858-1913) "Engineering Valuation of Public Utilities and Factories," Halbert Powers Gillette's "Cost Data" and Henry Floy's "Valuation of Public Utility Properties".

Fish defined engineering economics primarily concerned with matters of economic selection and structure. Fish defined economic selection as a choice based solely upon a "long-run least cost." In modern engineering terminology, meeting a requirement implies some "sort of instrument which... will perform the service"

John Charles Lounsbury Fish is also the author of the coordinates of elementary surveying, a book that was first published in 1909.

== See also ==
- Engineering Economics
- Engineering economics (civil engineering)
