= Average accounting return =

The average accounting return (AAR) is the average project earnings after taxes and depreciation, divided by the average book value of the investment during its life. Approach to making capital budgeting decisions involves the average accounting return (AAR). There are many different definitions of the AAR. However, in one form or another, the AAR is always defined as: Some measure of average accounting profit divided by some measure of average accounting value. The specific definition we will use is: Average net income divided by Average book value. It is kinds of decision rule to accept or reject the finance project. For decide to these projects value, it needs cutoff rate. This rate is kind of deadline whether this project produces net income or net loss.

There are three steps to calculating the AAR.

First, determine the average net income of each year of the project's life. Second, determine the average investment, taking depreciation into account. Third, determine the AAR by dividing the average net income by the average investment. After determine the AAR, compare with target cutoff rate. For example, if AAR determined is 20%, and given cutoff rate is 25%, then this project should be rejected. Because AAR is lower than cutoff rate so this project will not make sufficient net income to cover initial cost. Average accounting return(AAR) does have advantages and disadvantages. Advantages; It is easier to calculate than other capital budgeting decision rules. It only needs net income data and book values of the investment during its life. Another advantage is needed information will usually be available. Disadvantage; it does not take time value of money into account. When we average figures that occur at different times, we are treating the near future and the more distant future in the same way. Therefore, there is no clear indication of profitability. Also the use of an arbitrary benchmark cutoff rate is a disadvantage. The last disadvantage is it is based on accounting net income and book values, not cash flows and market values.

== Comparison with discounted cash flow methods ==
Unlike discounted cash flow (DCF) techniques such as Net present value (NPV) and Internal rate of return (IRR), the average accounting return does not discount future earnings to present value. DCF methods evaluate projects based on projected cash flows and incorporate the time value of money, whereas AAR relies on accounting profits derived from financial statements.

Because AAR is based on accounting income and book values rather than cash flows and market values, it may produce rankings of projects that differ from those generated using NPV or IRR. For this reason, financial theory generally considers discounted cash flow methods to provide a more accurate measure of a project's contribution to firm value.

== See also ==
- Accounting rate of return
