= Trive Capital =

American private equity firm

- Type: Private
- Industry: Private equity
- Founded: 1912; 114 years ago
- Headquarters: Dallas, Texas
- Website: www.trivecapital.com

Trive Capital is an American private equity firm headquartered in Dallas, Texas, that primarily focuses on middle-market investments in companies in North America with $8.5 billion of assets under management.

== History ==
Trive Capital was founded in 2012 by Conner Searcy with Chris Zugaro. The firm deploys both equity and debt capital within the private equity industry for situational investing and operational involvement in portfolio businesses.

Since its inception, the firm has raised multiple investment funds. Its first fund, Trive Capital Fund I LP, closed with approximately $300 million in commitments.

In 2025, Trive completed the final closing of its fifth institutional fund, Trive Capital Fund V, LP, with approximately $2.7 billion in commitments.

One of Trive’s portfolio companies, Karman Holdings, a defense and space systems provider, completed an upsized initial public offering (IPO) in February 2025. According to Reuters, Karman raised approximately $506 million in its IPO and was valued at nearly $3 billion, with Trive retaining majority voting power after the offering.

Trive has formed Canopy Aerospace & Defense, a materials company combining Hera Technologies and MSM Industries. The company supplies insulative, absorptive, and signal-reducing materials for defense and commercial platforms.

== See also ==
- Private equity
- Venture capital
