= William C. Gotshall =

American civil engineer (1870–1935)

William Charles Gotshall
- Born: May 9, 1870; Saint Louis, Missouri, US
- Died: August 20, 1935 (aged 65); New York City, US
- Education: Civil engineer
- Engineering career
- Discipline: Railroad engineering
- Institutions: Lehigh University

William Charles Gotshall (May 9, 1870 – August 20, 1935) was an American civil engineer known for his research on engineering economics in civil engineering published as Notes of electric railway economics and preliminary engineering (1903, 1904). He was also responsible for the conversion of the Second Avenue Railroad in New York from horses to conduit electrical power in 1897–1898.

== Early life and career ==
William Charles Gotshall, was born in St. Louis, Mo., on May 9, 1870, the son of Daniel H. Gotshall (1844–1909) and Minnie Wortmann Gotshall (1845–1918). He married German-born Adelaide von Rathgen on September 15, 1897.

== Military service ==
Gotshall was commissioned as a Major of Engineers in the New York Guard in June 1917 and discharged in 1920. His service consisted of surveying, locating and constructing military roads as well as assisting in railroad design and camp layouts.

== Death ==
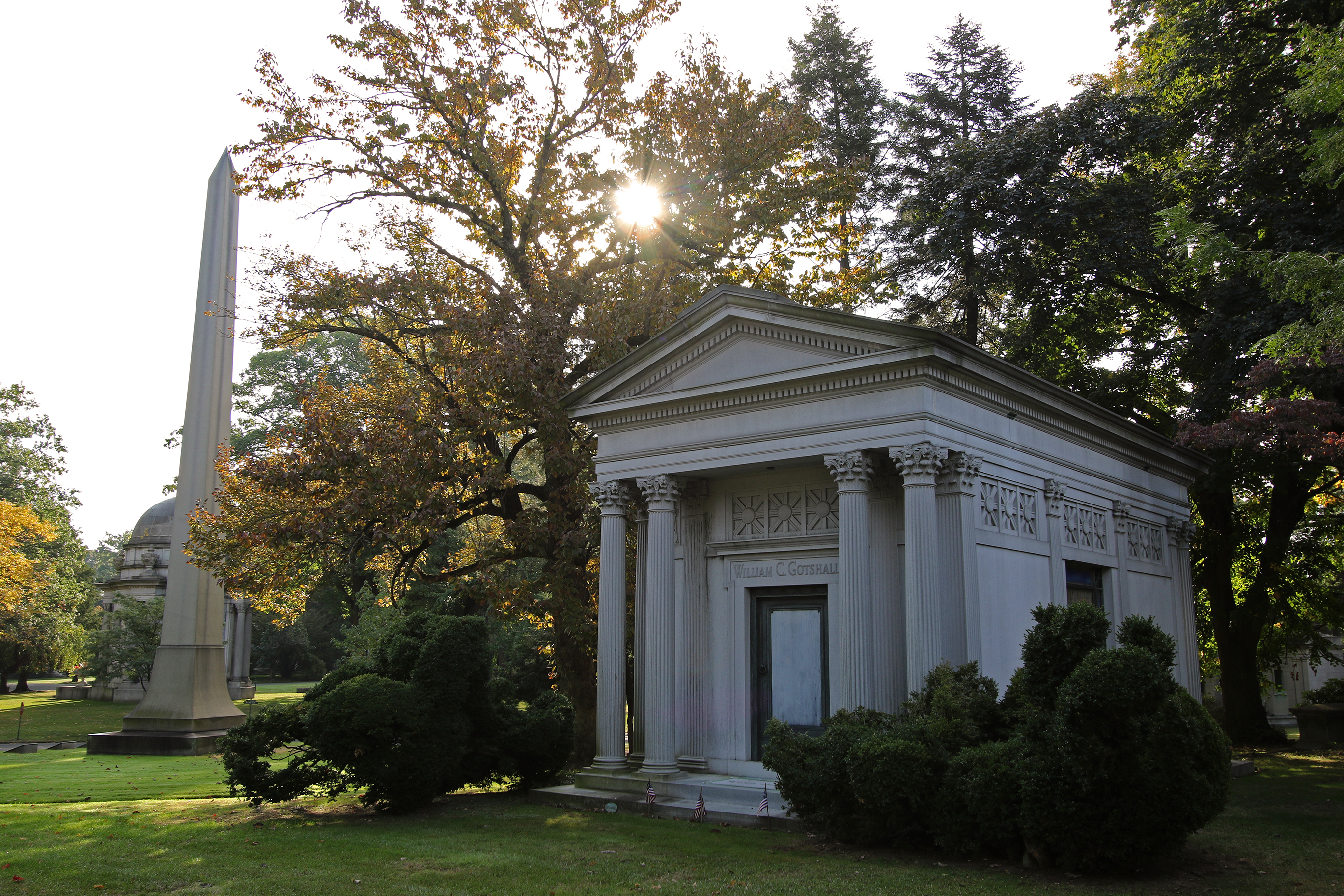
William C. Gotshall mausoleum

Gotshall died in New City on August 20, 1935.

=== The Gotshall collection ===
At the time of his death in 1935, Gotshall possessed an extensive collection of books and in his will left this collection to the New York State Library, one of the largest in the world.

== Bibliography ==
- Notes on electric railway economics and preliminary engineering. New York: McGraw Publ. Co.. (1903).
- Railway (Electric) Economics (article), Beach, Frederick Converse, and George Edwin Rines, eds. The encyclopedia americana. Vol. 10. New York: Americana Company, 1904.

== See also ==
- Engineering economics (civil engineering)
