= Hopkins Classical School =

Defunct school in Cambridge, Massachusetts

Information
- Established: 1839
- Closed: 1854

The Hopkins Classical School (1839–1854) in Cambridge, Massachusetts, was a secondary school located near the corner of Massachusetts Avenue and Dana Street. It received financial support from the bequest of Edward Hopkins.

== Notable staff ==
Staff included John Benjamin Henck.

== Alumni ==
Students included George Martin Lane, William C. Lovering, James Mills Peirce, George D. Robinson, and William Robert Ware.

== See also ==
- Hopkins Academy, Hadley, Massachusetts
- Hopkins School, New Haven, Connecticut
