= San Xoán de Río =

- Municipality
- Flag Coat of arms

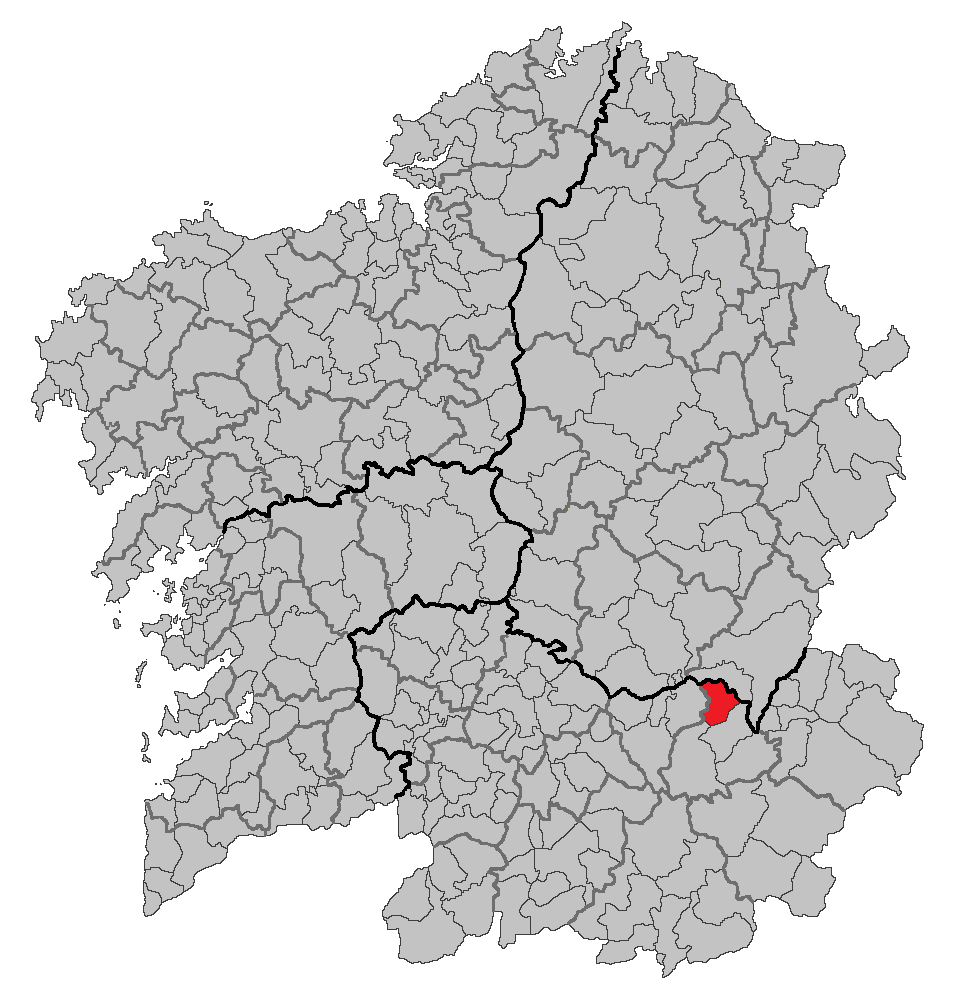
- Location in Galicia

- Location in Spain
- Coordinates: 42°23′04″N 7°18′51″W
- Country: Spain
- Autonomous community: Galicia
- Province: Ourense
- Comarca: Terra de Trives

Government
  - Mayor: Luis Castro (PSdeG-PSOE)

Area
  - Total: 61.1 km^{2} (23.6 sq mi)
- Elevation: 875 m (2,871 ft)

Population (2025-01-01)
  - Total: 510
  - Density: 8.3/km^{2} (22/sq mi)
- Time zone: UTC+1 (CET)
  - Summer (DST): UTC+2 (CEST)
- Website: www.sanxoanderio.es/

San Xoán de Río is a municipality in the province of Ourense, in the autonomous community of Galicia, Spain. It belongs to the comarca of Terra de Trives. It is named after Saint John (Galician: San Xoán), the local patron. The village of Domecelle is located within the municipality.
