= Arthur M. Wellington =

American civil engineer

Arthur Mellen Wellington
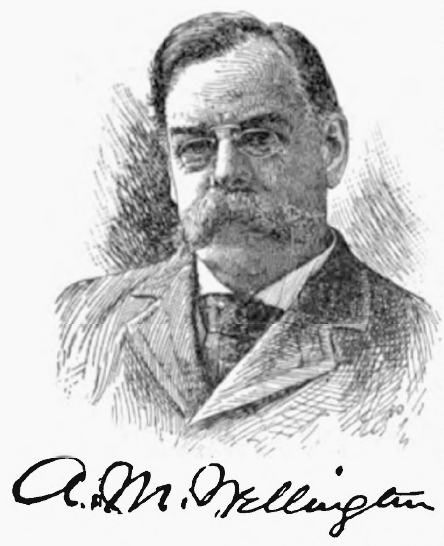
- Born: December 20, 1847; Waltham, Massachusetts, US
- Died: May 17, 1895 (aged 47); Manhattan, New York, US
- Resting place: Woodlawn Cemetery
- Occupation: Civil Engineer
- Spouse: Agnes Bates

Arthur Mellen Wellington (December 20, 1847 – May 17, 1895) was an American civil engineer who wrote the 1877 book The Economic Theory of the Location of Railways. The saying that An engineer can do for a dollar what any fool can do for two is an abridgement of a statement made in this work (see below). Wellington was involved in the design and construction of new railways in Mexico. He was chief engineer of the Toledo and Canada Southern Railroad. He was the editor of the Engineering News.

The pioneering effort of Wellington in engineering economics in the 1870s was continued by John Charles Lounsbury Fish with the publication of Engineering Economics: First Principles in 1923 and the first publication of the Principles of Engineering Economy in 1930 by Eugene L. Grant.

== Early life and works ==
He was born on December 25, 1847, in Waltham, Massachusetts. In 1878, he married Agnes Bates, and they had two children. Wellington was a descendant of Roger Wellington, an early settler of the Massachusetts Bay Colony in 1636 and Benjamin Wellington. In 1863, Wellington graduated from the Boston Latin School and then studied engineering with John Benjamin Henck, a prominent civil engineer practicing in Boston. While his work with Henck took place during the American Civil War, he studied mechanical engineering and passed the examination for an assistant engineer in the United States Navy but with the end of the War, never received an appointment.

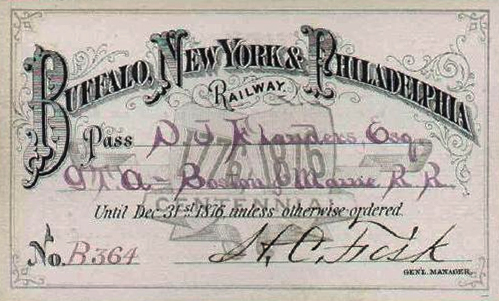
Buffalo, New York & Philadelphia railroad pass issued by Albert Fink

== Surveyor and locating engineer ==
Wellington left Henck's office in 1866 to work as a surveyor in the engineers corps at the Brooklyn Parks department on the Prospect Park project under Frederick Law Olmsted. In 1868, he took a position as a surveyor on a locating party for the Blue Ridge railroad in South Carolina in charge of a series of explorations to find possible routes for the railroad. Wellington left the South Carolina road and went on to practice location engineering for the Dutchess & Columbia railroad in New York state. He left that road in 1870 to work on the Buffalo, New York & Philadelphia railroad as a division engineer for the next three years. He continued in this position until the financial panic of 1873 put a sudden stop to railway construction. He was appointed as Chief Engineer of the Toledo and Canada Southern Railway in 1872. He then went to work for the Buffalo and Erie Railroad, the West Farms Railway and the Canadian Great Western Railway. He was made engineer in charge of the Mexican National Railway in March 1881, and afterward, he became the assistant general manager of the Mexican Central Railway. He returned to Manhattan, New York City and became one of the editors of The Railroad Gazette in 1884.

== Honors ==
He then became editor and part owner of The Engineering News. In 1891, Wellington was elected a member of the Canadian Society of Civil Engineers.

== Famous Quotation ==
The famous quotation, 'An engineer can do for a dollar what any fool can do for two," is a shortened version of this statement below, which appears in the introduction to his magnum opus, "The Economic Theory of the Location of Railways," published in 1877:

"It would be well if engineering were less generally thought of, and even defined, as the art of constructing. In a certain important sense it is rather the art of not constructing; or, to define it rudely but not inaptly, it is the art of doing that well with one dollar, which any bungler can do with two after a fashion."

== Death ==
Wellington died on May 17, 1895, from heart failure following surgery in Manhattan, New York City, at age 47.

== Partial bibliography ==
- Methods for the computation from diagrams of preliminary and final estimates of railway earthwork: with diagrams giving quantities on inspection to the nearest cubic yard, for both regular and irregular sections, direct from ordinary field-notes. New York: D. Appleton and company. 1875.
- "Justification Expenditure for Improving the Alignment of Railways". Railroad Gazette. September–December 1876.
- Wellington, A.M. (1877). Economic theory of the location of railways: an analysis of the conditions controlling the laying out of railways to effect the most judicious expenditure of capital (first ed.). New York: Wiley. and revised through six editions with the last published in 1910 by Wellington's wife, Agnes Wellington.
- Wellington; Drummond, Victor. "Report respecting railways and trade in Mexico". Great Britain House of Commons Sessional papers 1881 LXXXIX 390 401 Cd 2944.
- "The American line from Vera Cruz to the City of Mexico via Jalapa". American Society of Civil Engineers Transactions. XV: 791–829. 1886. Wellington was chief engineer in charge of the 1881 survey. See also "(unspecified)". Engineering News. XVIII: 165–6, 182–3 and 202–3. 1887.
- Wellington, A.M. (1888). New York & Brooklyn Bridge: report of the Board of Experts to the terminal committee of the Board of Trustees as to enlargement of traffic facilities of the Brooklyn Bridge. New York. with an appendix containing the report descriptive of the recommended plan submitted to the Board of Experts Brooklyn Bridge (New York, N. Board of Experts. (1888).
- Rudolph, Hering; Wellington, A.M. (1893). Piles and pile-driving. Engineering News Publishing Co. being a reprint of some of the articles which have appeared in Engineering News on pile driving and the safe load of piles and of the pamphlet.

== Patents ==
Wellington received three patents for his work:

- Patent No. 549,981 thru 549,983.

== Legacy ==
- In 1921, the American Society of Civil Engineers instituted a prize, the Arthur M. Wellington Prize, in response to a proposal by the Engineering News-Record, which had endowed the award in honor of Wellington who was a former editor and part proprietor of Engineering News.
- In 1979, the then-named American Institute of Industrial Engineers, (now Institute of Industrial and Systems Engineers or IISE) created the Wellington Award in honor of his work in engineering economy to recognize "...contributions and service in the field of engineering economy that enhance the visibility of the engineering economy division of IISE."
  - Its first four recipients were Eugene L. Grant (1979), Arthur Lesser Jr (1980), W. Grant Ireson (1981) and H.G. Thuesen (1982).
- His book The Economic Theory of the Location of Railways was first published in 1877 by the Railroad Gazette and John Wiley New York. The subtitle was An analysis of the conditions which govern the judicious adjustment of gradients, curvature, and length of line to each other, and the character and volume of traffic. The 5th edition had the subtitle An analysis of the conditions controlling the laying out of railways to effect the most judicious expenditure of capital. He indicated the importance of the ruling gradient and its effect on train loads and running costs. By 1910 it was in its 6th edition and had also been printed in London.
