= John Benjamin Henck =

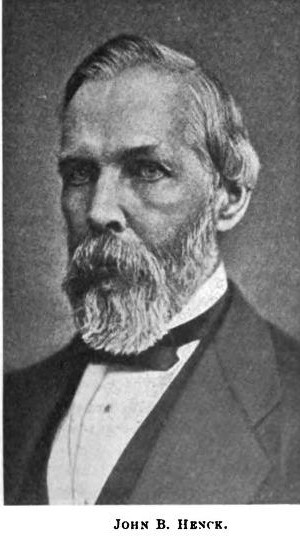

John Benjamin Henck (October 20, 1815 Philadelphia – January 3, 1903 Montecito, California) although educated as a classical scholar and graduating as valedictorian of the Harvard class of 1840 yet, during his career, transitioned to a practicing civil engineer. As an engineering educator, Henck required a strict knowledge of classical literature" and a "thorough and accurate knowledge of science". One of his notable students was Arthur M Wellington, author of The Economic Theory of the Location of Railways.(1877, first edition.)

== Biography ==
Henck was the son of George Daniel and Caroline (Spiess) Henck. He was prepared for college mainly by home study, and graduated from Harvard University, valedictorian, in 1840. He was principal of Hopkins Classical School in Cambridge, Massachusetts, 1840-1841, professor of Latin and Greek at the University of Maryland, 1841-1842, and professor of Latin and Greek at Germantown Academy, Philadelphia, where he remained until 1847.

The need to provide for a growing family prompted him to turn his attention to the more lucrative field of civil engineering. He began by studying in the office of Felton and Parker, Charlestown, Massachusetts. In 1848, he opened his own consulting practice and immediately had charge of the building of a railroad from Charlestown, New Hampshire, to Windsor, Vermont. In 1849 he was in charge of the construction of the Fitchburg Railroad near Boston, after which he established an office in Boston with William S. Whitwell (Whitwell & Henck) and was frequently called upon as an expert to decide on the work of others.

He was appointed engineer to the Massachusetts State Commission on Public Lands, and continued in that position, with an interruption of two or three years, until 1881. (In 1877, the State Commission on Public Lands was abolished and its tasks became those of the Massachusetts Board of Land Commissioners.) He had charge of the laying out and filling up of new lands of the state of Massachusetts and Boston Water Power Company, now known as the Back Bay district in Boston. He was probably the engineer with the most responsibility for that project.

When the Massachusetts Institute of Technology began offering classes in 1865, he was the head of the department of civil engineering, a post he retained until 1881. But meanwhile he continued his oversight of the laying out of streets and lots in the Back Bay. He was engineer for the Metropolitan and other street railroads in Boston and vicinity, 1856-1861. As an engineering educator, Henck required a "thorough and accurate knowledge of science," just as he once had advocated a strict knowledge of classical literature".

== Works ==
He wrote numerous poems, mathematical papers, and a Field-Book for Railroad Engineers (1854; revised and enlarged, 1881 and 1896).
