= Matthias N. Forney =

American mechanical engineer and magazine editor (1835-1908)

Matthias Nace Forney (March 28, 1835 – January 14, 1908) was an American steam locomotive designer and builder. He is most well known for the design of the Forney type locomotive. Locomotives that he designed served the elevated railroads of New York City for many years before that system converted to electric power. One example of a Forney 0-4-4T locomotive built in 1902 by Baldwin Locomotive Works has been restored for daily operations on the Disneyland Railroad in Anaheim, California, as the railroad's number 5, Ward Kimball.

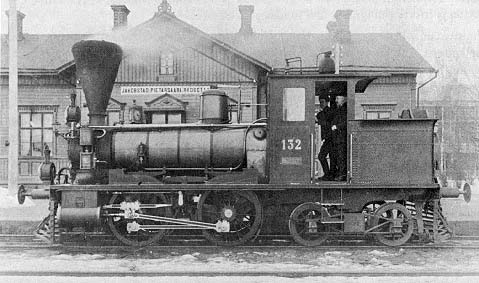
A Finnish Steam Locomotive Class F1, an 0-4-4T Forney type built by SLM in 1886 for Finnish State Railways.

Forney was born March 28, 1835, in Hanover, Pennsylvania. He apprenticed with another prominent locomotive builder, Ross Winans, before joining the Baltimore and Ohio Railroad (B&O) as a draftsman in 1855. He left the B&O in 1858, then worked for the Illinois Central Railroad from about 1861 to 1864. In that position, he patented an 0-4-4T locomotive that was the first of the "Forney" types of locomotives, characterized by the truck (US) or bogie (UK) under the coal bunker/water tank. In 1865 Forney changed employers again, this time to the Hinkley Locomotive Works, where he stayed until 1870. At that time, he started working as an associate editor for Railroad Gazette and quickly earned a reputation as an expert in steam locomotive theory. In late 1886, he bought the rival publication American Railroad Journal, as well as Van Nostrand's Engineering Magazine. He merged the two titles as The Railroad and Engineering Journal, describing himself as "Editor and Proprietor". He renamed the publication American Engineer and Railroad Journal in 1893.

Forney was a founding member of the American Society of Mechanical Engineers, and he participated heavily in other engineering organizations such as the Master Car Builders Association.

He died on January 14, 1908, in New York, New York.

== Legacy ==
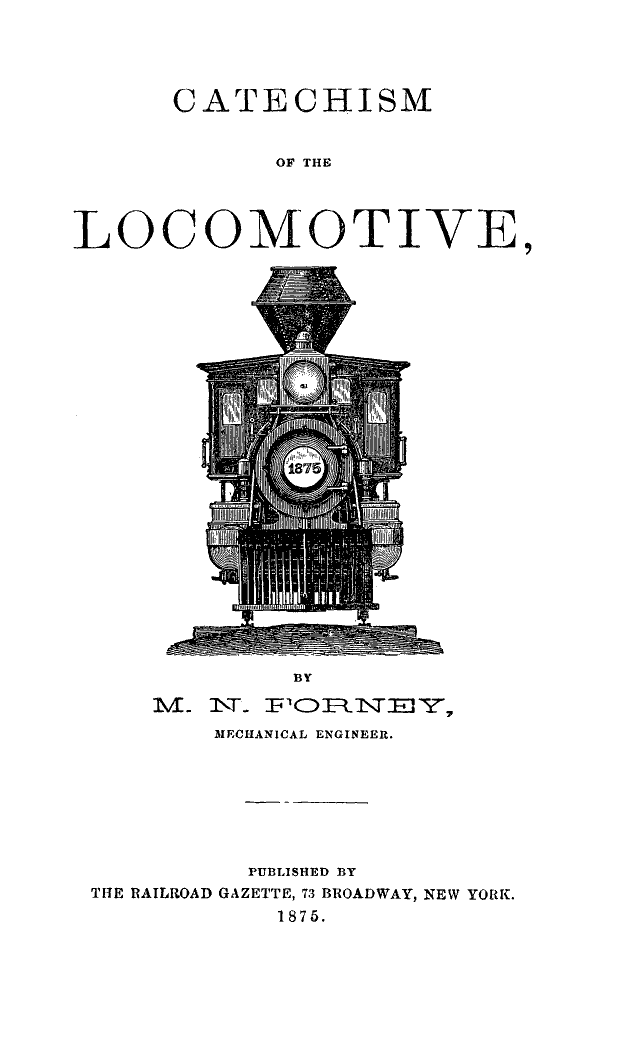
The cover page to the 1875 edition of Forney's book.

Forney was the author of the book Catechism of the Locomotive, first published in 1873. This work is recognized as the seminal authority on steam locomotive construction in the late 19th century.

He was an editor for The Railroad Gazette, an influential weekly newspaper, for many years, including 1880 (with S. Wright Dunning).

The Forney Transportation Museum in Denver, Colorado, has a Forney Locomotive 040-T on display. The museum was founded by Matthais Forney's second cousin J.D. Forney, founder of Forney Industries.
