= A Encomenda, A Pobra de Trives =

Coordinates: 42.3175°N 7.256388°W

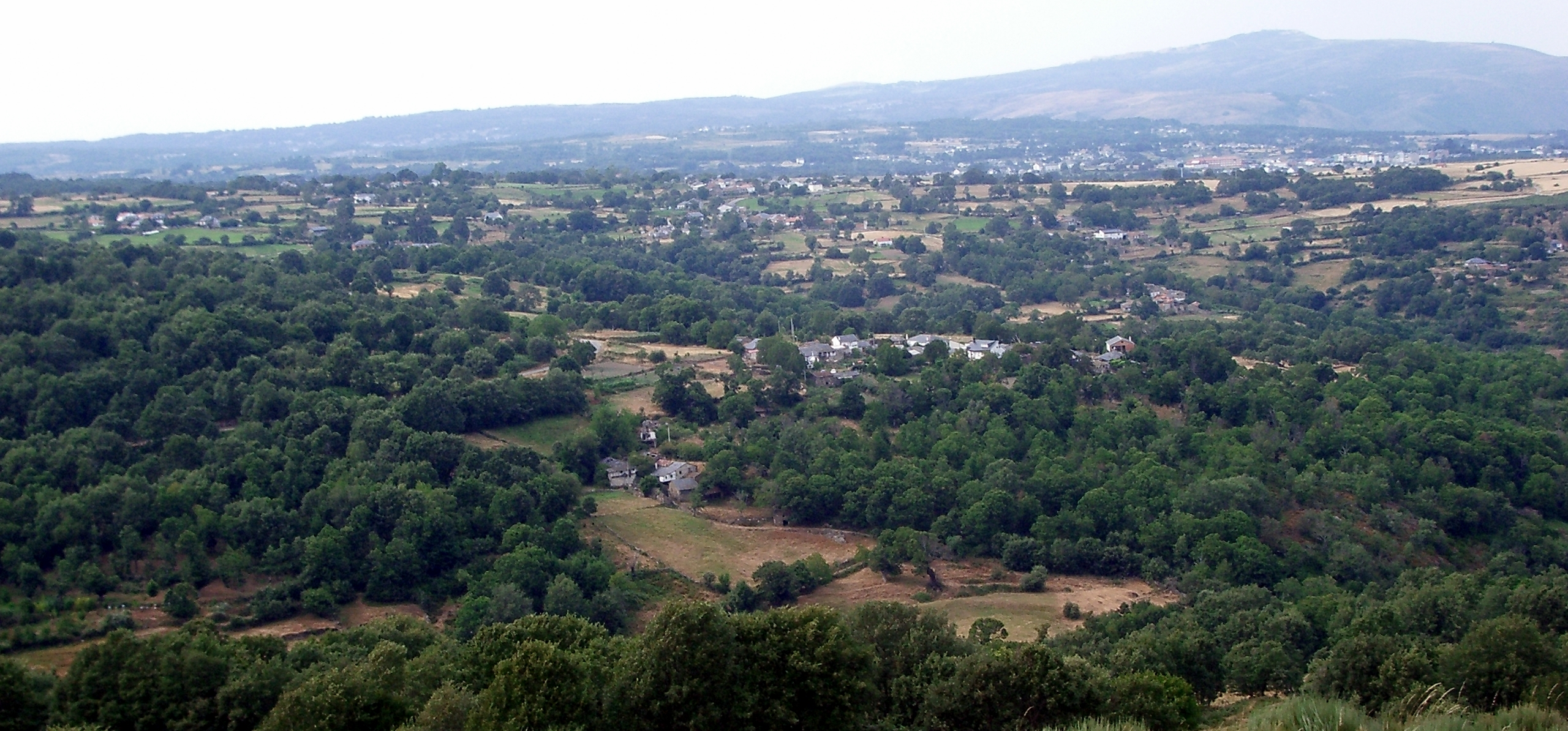
Panorimical view of the parish A Encomenda from the Escrita rock.

A Encomenda (San Antonio) is a parish in A Pobra de Trives municipality, Ourense province, Galicia region of north-west Spain. It lies towards the north-east of the province.

As of 2009, the population of A Encomenda was 123 (60 males).
