= Net present value =

Valuation in finance

Net present value (NPV), also known as net present worth (NPW) is a method for assessing whether future amounts of money are worth more or less than the cost of an investment made today. It is widely used in finance, economics, and project evaluation to judge whether a planned activity is expected to create value. NPV works by converting future cash flows into their “present value,” recognising that money available now is more valuable than the same amount received later. This adjustment reflects factors such as interest rates, inflation, and the opportunity to use money for other purposes.

An investment typically has a positive NPV when the present value of its expected future benefits exceeds its initial cost, indicating that it is likely to be financially worthwhile. A negative NPV suggests the opposite. Because it summarises expected gains and losses in a single figure, NPV is a central tool for comparing alternative projects and making informed financial and economic decisions.

Net Present Value measures the value of an asset that has cashflow by adding up the present value of all future cash flows that asset will generate. The present value of a cash flow depends on the interval of time between now and the cash flow because of the time value of money (which includes the annual effective discount rate). It provides a method for evaluating and comparing capital projects or financial products with cash flows spread over time, as in loans, investments, payouts from insurance contracts plus many other applications.

Time value of money dictates that time affects the value of cash flows. For example, a lender may offer 99 cents for the promise of receiving $1.00 a month from now, but the promise to receive that same dollar 20 years in the future would be worth much less today to that same person (lender), even if the payback in both cases was equally certain. This decrease in the current value of future cash flows is based on a chosen rate of return (or discount rate). If for example there exists a time series of identical cash flows, the cash flow in the present is the most valuable, with each future cash flow becoming less valuable than the previous cash flow. A cash flow today is more valuable than an identical cash flow in the future because a present flow can be invested immediately and begin earning returns, while a future flow cannot.

== How NPV is determined ==
NPV is determined by calculating the costs (negative cash flows) and benefits (positive cash flows) for each period of an investment. After the cash flow for each period is calculated, the present value (PV) of each one is achieved by discounting its future value (see Formula) at a periodic rate of return (the rate of return dictated by the market). NPV is the sum of all the discounted future cash flows.

Because of its simplicity, NPV is a useful tool to determine whether a project or investment will result in a net profit or a loss. A positive NPV results in profit, while a negative NPV results in a loss. The NPV measures the excess or shortfall of cash flows, in present value terms, above the cost of funds. In a theoretical situation of unlimited capital budgeting, a company should pursue every investment with a positive NPV. However, in practical terms a company's capital constraints limit investments to projects with the highest NPV whose cost cash flows, or initial cash investment, do not exceed the company's capital. NPV is a central tool in discounted cash flow (DCF) analysis and is a standard method for using the time value of money to appraise long-term projects. It is widely used throughout economics, financial analysis, and financial accounting.

In the case when all future cash flows are positive, or incoming (such as the principal and coupon payment of a bond) the only outflow of cash is the purchase price, the NPV is simply the PV of future cash flows minus the purchase price (which is its own PV). NPV can be described as the "difference amount" between the sums of discounted cash inflows and cash outflows. It compares the present value of money today to the present value of money in the future, taking inflation and returns into account.

The NPV of a sequence of cash flows takes as input the cash flows and a discount rate or discount curve and outputs a present value, which is the current fair price. The converse process in discounted cash flow (DCF) analysis takes a sequence of cash flows and a price as input and as output the discount rate, or internal rate of return (IRR) which would yield the given price as NPV. This rate, called the yield, is widely used in bond trading.

== Formula ==
Each cash inflow/outflow is discounted back to its present value (PV). Then all are summed such that NPV is the sum of all terms:
$$\mathrm{PV} = \frac{R_t}{(1+i)^t}$$
where:

- t is the time of the cash flow
- i is the discount rate, i.e. the return that could be earned per unit of time on an investment with similar risk
- $R_t$ is the net cash flow i.e. cash inflow − cash outflow, at time t. For educational purposes, $R_0$ is commonly placed to the left of the sum to emphasize its role as (minus) the investment.
- $1/(1+i)^t$ is the discount factor, also known as the present value factor.

The result of this formula is multiplied with the Annual Net cash in-flows and reduced by Initial Cash outlay the present value, but in cases where the cash flows are not equal in amount, the previous formula will be used to determine the present value of each cash flow separately. Any cash flow within 12 months will not be discounted for NPV purpose, nevertheless the usual initial investments during the first year R_{0} are summed up a negative cash flow.

The NPV can also be thought of as the difference between the discounted benefits and costs over time. As such, the NPV can also be written as:

$$\mathrm{NPV} = \mathrm{PV}(B) - \mathrm{PV}(C)$$

where:

- B are the benefits or cash inflows
- C are the costs or cash outflows

Given the (period, cash inflows, cash outflows) shown by (t, $B_t$, $C_t$) where N is the total number of periods, the net present value $\mathrm{NPV}$ is given by:

$$\mathrm{NPV}(i, N) = \sum_{t=0}^N \frac{B_t}{(1+i)^t} - \sum_{t=0}^N \frac{C_t}{(1+i)^t}$$

where:

- $B_t$ are the benefits or cash inflows at time t.
- $C_t$ are the costs or cash outflows at time t.

The NPV can be rewritten using the net cash flow $(R_t)$ in each time period as:
$$\mathrm{NPV}(i, N) = \sum_{t=0}^N \frac{R_t}{(1+i)^t}$$
By convention, the initial period occurs at time $t = 0$, where cash flows in successive periods are then discounted from $t = 1, 2, 3 ...$ and so on. Furthermore, all future cash flows during a period are assumed to be at the end of each period. For constant cash flow R, the net present value $\mathrm{NPV}$ is a finite geometric series and is given by:

$$\mathrm{NPV}(i, N, R) = R \left( \frac{ 1 -\left( \frac{1}{1 + i} \right)^{N+1}} { 1 - \left( \frac{1}{1+i} \right) } \right), \quad i \ne 0$$

Inclusion of the $R_0$ term is important in the above formulae. A typical capital project involves a large negative $R_0$ cashflow (the initial investment) with positive future cashflows (the return on the investment). A key assessment is whether, for a given discount rate, the NPV is positive (profitable) or negative (loss-making). The IRR is the discount rate for which the NPV is exactly 0.

== Capital efficiency ==
The NPV method can be slightly adjusted to calculate how much money is contributed to a project's investment per dollar invested. This is known as the capital efficiency ratio. The formula for the net present value per dollar investment (NPVI) is given below:

$$\mathrm{NPVI}(i, N) = \frac{\sum_{t=1}^N \frac{R_t}{(1+i)^t}}{\sum_{t=1}^N \frac{C_t}{(1+i)^t}}$$

where:

- $R_t$ is the net cash flow i.e. cash inflow − cash outflow, at time t.
- $C_t$ are the net cash outflows, at time t.

=== Example ===
If the discounted benefits across the life of a project are $100 million and the discounted net costs across the life of a project are $60 million then the NPVI is:

NPVI= ($100M-$60M)/$60M ≈ 0.6667

That is for every dollar invested in the project, a contribution of $0.6667 is made to the project's NPV.

== Alternative discounting frequencies ==
The NPV formula assumes that the benefits and costs occur at the end of each period, resulting in a more conservative NPV. However, it may be that the cash inflows and outflows occur at the beginning of the period or in the middle of the period.

The NPV formula for mid period discounting is given by:

$$\mathrm{NPV}(i, N) = \sum_{t=0}^N \frac{R_t}{(1+i)^{t-0.5}}$$

Over a project's lifecycle, cash flows are typically spread across each period (for example spread across each year), and as such the middle of the year represents the average point in time in which these cash flows occur. Hence mid period discounting typically provides a more accurate, although less conservative NPV.

The NPV formula using beginning of period discounting is given by:

$$\mathrm{NPV}(i, N) = -\text{Initial Investment} + \sum_{t=1}^N \frac{R_t}{(1+i)^{t-1}}$$

This results in the least conservative NPV.

== The discount rate ==
The rate used to discount future cash flows to the present value is a key variable of this process.

A firm's weighted average cost of capital (after tax) is often used, but many people believe that it is appropriate to use higher discount rates to adjust for risk, opportunity cost, or other factors. A variable discount rate with higher rates applied to cash flows occurring further along the time span might be used to reflect the yield curve premium for long-term debt.

Another approach to choosing the discount rate factor is to decide the rate which the capital needed for the project could return if invested in an alternative venture. If, for example, the capital required for Project A can earn 5% elsewhere, use this discount rate in the NPV calculation to allow a direct comparison to be made between Project A and the alternative. Related to this concept is to use the firm's reinvestment rate. Re-investment rate can be defined as the rate of return for the firm's investments on average. When analyzing projects in a capital constrained environment, it may be appropriate to use the reinvestment rate rather than the firm's weighted average cost of capital as the discount factor. It reflects opportunity cost of investment, rather than the possibly lower cost of capital.

An NPV calculated using variable discount rates (if they are known for the duration of the investment) may better reflect the situation than one calculated from a constant discount rate for the entire investment duration. Refer to the tutorial article written by Samuel Baker for more detailed relationship between the NPV and the discount rate.

For some professional investors, their investment funds are committed to target a specified rate of return. In such cases, that rate of return should be selected as the discount rate for the NPV calculation. In this way, a direct comparison can be made between the profitability of the project and the desired rate of return.

To some extent, the selection of the discount rate is dependent on the use to which it will be put. If the intent is simply to determine whether a project will add value to the company, using the firm's weighted average cost of capital may be appropriate. If trying to decide between alternative investments in order to maximize the value of the firm, the corporate reinvestment rate would probably be a better choice.

=== Risk-adjusted net present value (rNPV) ===
Using variable rates over time, or discounting "guaranteed" cash flows differently from "at risk" cash flows, may be a superior methodology but is seldom used in practice. Using the discount rate to adjust for risk is often difficult to do in practice (especially internationally) and is difficult to do well.

An alternative to using discount factor to adjust for risk is to explicitly correct the cash flows for the risk elements using risk-adjusted net present value (rNPV) or a similar method, then discount at the firm's rate.

== Use in decision making ==
NPV is an indicator of how much value an investment or project adds to the firm. With a particular project, if $R_t$ is a positive value, the project is in the status of positive cash inflow in the time of t. If $R_t$ is a negative value, the project is in the status of discounted cash outflow in the time of t. Appropriately risked projects with a positive NPV could be accepted. This does not necessarily mean that they should be undertaken since NPV at the cost of capital may not account for opportunity cost, i.e., comparison with other available investments. In financial theory, if there is a choice between two mutually exclusive alternatives, the one yielding the higher NPV should be selected. A positive net present value indicates that the projected earnings generated by a project or investment (in present dollars) exceeds the anticipated costs (also in present dollars). This concept is the basis for the Net Present Value Rule, which dictates that the only investments that should be made are those with positive NPVs.

An investment with a positive NPV is profitable, but one with a negative NPV will not necessarily result in a net loss: it is just that the internal rate of return of the project falls below the required rate of return.

If...	It means...	Then...
NPV > 0	the investment would add value to the firm	the project may be accepted
NPV < 0	the investment would subtract value from the firm	the project may be rejected
NPV = 0	the investment would neither gain nor lose value for the firm	We should be indifferent in the decision whether to accept or reject the project. This project adds no monetary value. Decision should be based on other criteria, e.g., strategic positioning or other factors not explicitly included in the calculation.

== Advantages and disadvantages of using Net Present Value ==
NPV is an indicator for project investments, and has several advantages and disadvantages for decision-making.

=== Advantages ===
The NPV includes all relevant time periods and cash flows for the project by considering the time value of money, which is consistent with the goal of wealth maximization by creating the greatest wealth for shareholders.

The NPV formula accounts for cash flow timing patterns and size differences for each project, and provides an easy, unambiguous dollar value comparison of different investment options.

The NPV can be easily calculated using modern spreadsheets, under the assumption that the discount rate and future cash flows are known. For a firm considering investing in multiple projects, the NPV has the benefit of being additive. That is, the NPVs of different projects may be aggregated to calculate the highest wealth creation, based on the available capital that can be invested by a firm.

=== Disadvantages ===
The NPV method has several disadvantages.

The NPV approach does not consider hidden costs and project size. Thus, investment decisions on projects with substantial hidden costs may not be accurate.

==== Relies on input parameters such as knowledge of future cash flows ====
The NPV is heavily dependent on knowledge of future cash flows, their timing, the length of a project, the initial investment required, and the discount rate. Hence, it can only be accurate if these input parameters are correct; although, sensitivity analyzes can be undertaken to examine how the NPV changes as the input variables are changed, thus reducing the uncertainty of the NPV.

==== Relies on choice of discount rate and discount factor ====
The accuracy of the NPV method relies heavily on the choice of a discount rate and hence discount factor, representing an investment's true risk premium. The discount rate is assumed to be constant over the life of an investment; however, discount rates can change over time. For example, discount rates can change as the cost of capital changes. There are other drawbacks to the NPV method, such as the fact that it displays a lack of consideration for a project’s size and the cost of capital.

==== Lack of consideration of non-financial metrics ====
The NPV calculation is purely financial and thus does not consider non-financial metrics that may be relevant to an investment decision.

==== Difficulty in comparing mutually exclusive projects ====
Comparing mutually exclusive projects with different investment horizons can be difficult. Since unequal projects are all assumed to have duplicate investment horizons, the NPV approach can be used to compare the optimal duration NPV.

== Interpretation as integral transform ==
The time-discrete formula of the net present value

$$\mathrm{NPV}(i,N) = \sum_{t=0}^{N} \frac{R_t}{ (1+i) ^{t}}$$

can also be written in a continuous variation

$$\mathrm{NPV}(i) = \int_{t=0}^\infty (1+i)^{-t} \cdot r(t) \, dt$$

where

${R_t}$ is the rate of flowing cash given in money per time, and ${R_t}$ = 0 when the investment is over.

Net present value can be regarded as Laplace- respectively Z-transformed cash flow with the integral operator including the complex number s which resembles to the interest rate i from the real number space or more precisely s = ln(1 + i).

$$F(s) = \left\{ \mathcal{L} f\right\}(s) = \int_0^\infty e^{-st} f(t) \,dt$$

From this follow simplifications known from cybernetics, control theory and system dynamics. Imaginary parts of the complex number s describe the oscillating behaviour (compare with the pork cycle, cobweb theorem, and phase shift between commodity price and supply offer) whereas real parts are responsible for representing the effect of compound interest (compare with damping).

== Example ==
A corporation must decide whether to introduce a new product line. The company will have immediate costs of 100,000 at t = 0. Recall, a cost is a negative for outgoing cash flow, thus this cash flow is represented as −100,000. The company assumes the product will provide equal benefits of 10,000 for each of 12 years beginning at t = 1. For simplicity, assume the company will have no outgoing cash flows after the initial 100,000 cost. This also makes the simplifying assumption that the net cash received or paid is lumped into a single transaction occurring on the last day of each year. At the end of the 12 years the product no longer provides any cash flow and is discontinued without any additional costs. Assume that the effective annual discount rate is 10%.

The present value (value at t = 0) can be calculated for each year:

Year	Cash flow	Present value
T = 0	$\frac{-100,000}{(1+0.10)^0}$	−100,000
T = 1	$\frac{10,000}{(1+0.10)^1}$	9,090.91
T = 2	$\frac{10,000}{(1+0.10)^2}$	8,264.46
T = 3	$\frac{10,000}{(1+0.10)^3}$	7,513.15
T = 4	$\frac{10,000}{(1+0.10)^4}$	6,830.13
T = 5	$\frac{10,000}{(1+0.10)^5}$	6,209.21
T = 6	$\frac{10,000}{(1+0.10)^6}$	5,644.74
T = 7	$\frac{10,000}{(1+0.10)^7}$	5,131.58
T = 8	$\frac{10,000}{(1+0.10)^8}$	4,665.07
T = 9	$\frac{10,000}{(1+0.10)^9}$	4,240.98
T = 10	$\frac{10,000}{(1+0.10)^{10}}$	3,855.43
T = 11	$\frac{10,000}{(1+0.10)^{11}}$	3,504.94
T = 12	$\frac{10,000}{(1+0.10)^{12}}$	3,186.31

The total present value of the incoming cash flows is 68,136.91. The total present value of the outgoing cash flows is simply the 100,000 at time t = 0. Thus:

$$\mathrm{NPV} = PV(\text{benefits}) - PV(\text{costs})$$

In this example:

$$\begin{align}
\mathrm{NPV} &=  68,136.91 - 100,000
\\
& = -31,863.09
\end{align}$$

Observe that as t increases the present value of each cash flow at t decreases. For example, the final incoming cash flow has a future value of 10,000 at t = 12 but has a present value (at t = 0) of 3,186.31. The opposite of discounting is compounding. Taking the example in reverse, it is the equivalent of investing 3,186.31 at t = 0 (the present value) at an interest rate of 10% compounded for 12 years, which results in a cash flow of 10,000 at t = 12 (the future value).

The importance of NPV becomes clear in this instance. Although the incoming cash flows (10,000 × 12 = 120,000) appear to exceed the outgoing cash flow (100,000), the future cash flows are not adjusted using the discount rate. Thus, the project appears misleadingly profitable. When the cash flows are discounted however, it indicates the project would result in a net loss of 31,863.09. Thus, the NPV calculation indicates that this project should be disregarded because investing in this project is the equivalent of a loss of 31,863.09 at t = 0. The concept of time value of money indicates that cash flows in different periods of time cannot be accurately compared unless they have been adjusted to reflect their value at the same period of time (in this instance, t = 0). It is the present value of each future cash flow that must be determined in order to provide any meaningful comparison between cash flows at different periods of time. There are a few inherent assumptions in this type of analysis:

1. The investment horizon of all possible investment projects considered are equally acceptable to the investor (e.g. a 3-year project is not necessarily preferable vs. a 20-year project.)
2. The 10% discount rate is the appropriate (and stable) rate to discount the expected cash flows from each project being considered. Each project is assumed equally speculative.
3. The shareholders cannot get above a 10% return on their money if they were to directly assume an equivalent level of risk. (If the investor could do better elsewhere, no projects should be undertaken by the firm, and the excess capital should be turned over to the shareholder through dividends and stock repurchases.)

More realistic problems would also need to consider other factors, generally including: smaller time buckets, the calculation of taxes (including the cash flow timing), inflation, currency exchange fluctuations, hedged or unhedged commodity costs, risks of technical obsolescence, potential future competitive factors, uneven or unpredictable cash flows, and a more realistic salvage value assumption, as well as many others.

A more simple example of the net present value of incoming cash flow over a set period of time, would be winning a Powerball lottery of $500 million. If one does not select the "CASH" option they will be paid $25,000,000 per year for 20 years, a total of $500,000,000, however, if one does select the "CASH" option, they will receive a one-time lump sum payment of approximately $285 million, the NPV of $500,000,000 paid over time. See "other factors" above that could affect the payment amount. Both scenarios are before taxes.

== Common pitfalls ==
- If, for example, the R_{t} are generally negative late in the project (e.g., an industrial or mining project might have clean-up and restoration costs), then at that stage the company owes money, so a high discount rate is not cautious but too optimistic. Some people see this as a problem with NPV. A way to avoid this problem is to include explicit provision for financing any losses after the initial investment, that is, explicitly calculate the cost of financing such losses.
- Another common pitfall is to adjust for risk by adding a premium to the discount rate. Whilst a bank might charge a higher rate of interest for a risky project, that does not mean that this is a valid approach to adjusting a net present value for risk, although it can be a reasonable approximation in some specific cases. One reason such an approach may not work well can be seen from the following: if some risk is incurred resulting in some losses, then a discount rate in the NPV will reduce the effect of such losses below their true financial cost. A rigorous approach to risk requires identifying and valuing risks explicitly, e.g., by actuarial or Monte Carlo techniques, and explicitly calculating the cost of financing any losses incurred.
- Yet another issue can result from the compounding of the risk premium. R is a composite of the risk free rate and the risk premium. As a result, future cash flows are discounted by both the risk-free rate as well as the risk premium and this effect is compounded by each subsequent cash flow. This compounding results in a much lower NPV than might be otherwise calculated. The certainty equivalent model can be used to account for the risk premium without compounding its effect on present value.
- Another issue with relying on NPV is that it does not provide an overall picture of the gain or loss of executing a certain project. To see a percentage gain relative to the investments for the project, usually, Internal rate of return or other efficiency measures are used as a complement to NPV.
- Non-specialist users frequently make the error of computing NPV based on cash flows after interest. This is wrong because it double counts the time value of money. Free cash flow should be used as the basis for NPV computations.
- When using Microsoft's Excel, the "=NPV(...)" formula makes two assumptions that result in an incorrect solution. The first is that the amount of time between each item in the input array is constant and equidistant (e.g., 30 days of time between item 1 and item 2) which may not always be correct based on the cash flow that is being discounted. The second item is that the function will assume the item in the first position of the array is period 1 not period zero. This then results in incorrectly discounting all array items by one extra period. The easiest fix to both of these errors is to use the "=XNPV(...)" formula.

== Software support ==
Many computer-based spreadsheet programs have built-in formulae for PV and NPV.

== History ==
Net present value as a valuation methodology dates at least to the 19th century. Karl Marx refers to NPV as fictitious capital, and the calculation as "capitalising," writing:

The forming of a fictitious capital is called capitalising. Every periodically repeated income is capitalised by calculating it on the average rate of interest, as an income which would be realised by a capital at this rate of interest.

In mainstream neo-classical economics, NPV was formalized and popularized by Irving Fisher, in his 1907 The Rate of Interest and became included in textbooks from the 1950s onwards, starting in finance texts.

== Alternative capital budgeting methods ==
- Adjusted present value (APV): adjusted present value, is the net present value of a project if financed solely by ownership equity plus the present value of all the benefits of financing.
- Accounting rate of return (ARR): a ratio similar to IRR and MIRR
- Cost-benefit analysis: which includes issues other than cash, such as time savings.
- Internal rate of return (IRR): which calculates the rate of return of a project while disregarding the absolute amount of money to be gained.
- Modified internal rate of return (MIRR): similar to IRR, but it makes explicit assumptions about the reinvestment of the cash flows. Sometimes it is called Growth Rate of Return.
- Payback period: which measures the time required for the cash inflows to equal the original outlay. It measures risk, not return.
- Real option: which attempts to value managerial flexibility that is assumed away in NPV.
- Equivalent annual cost (EAC): a capital budgeting technique that is useful in comparing two or more projects with different lifespans.

=== Adjusted present value ===
Adjusted present value (APV) is a valuation method introduced in 1974 by Stewart Myers. The idea is to value the project as if it were all equity financed ("unleveraged"), and to then add the present value of the tax shield of debt – and other side effects.

=== Risk-adjusted net present value ===
Risk-adjusted net present value (rNPV) or expected net existing value (eNPV) is a method to value risky future cash flows. rNPV is the standard valuation method in the drug development industry, where sufficient data exists to estimate success rates for all R&D phases. A similar technique is used in the probability model of credit default swap (CDS) valuation.

rNPV modifies the standard NPV calculation of discounted cash flow (DCF) analysis by adjusting (multiplying) each cash flow by the estimated probability that it occurs (the estimated success rate). In the language of probability theory, the rNPV is the expected value. Note that this in contrast to the more general valuation approach, where risk is instead incorporated by adding a risk premium percentage to the discount rate, i.e. as opposed to weighting the cash flows.

=== Accounting rate of return ===
The accounting rate of return, also known as average rate of return, or ARR, is a financial ratio used in capital budgeting. The ratio does not take into account the concept of time value of money. ARR calculates the return, generated to net income of the proposed capital investment. The ARR is a percentage return. Say, if ARR = 7%, then it means that the project is expected to earn seven cents out of each dollar invested (yearly). If the ARR is equal to or greater than the required rate of return, the project is acceptable. If it is less than the desired rate, it should be rejected. When comparing investments, the higher the ARR, the more attractive the investment. More than half of large firms calculate ARR when appraising projects.

=== Cost-benefit analysis ===
Cost–benefit analysis (CBA), sometimes also called benefit–cost analysis, is a systematic approach to estimating the strengths and weaknesses of alternatives. It is used to determine options which provide the best approach to achieving benefits while preserving savings in, for example, transactions, activities, and functional business requirements. A CBA may be used to compare completed or potential courses of action, and to estimate or evaluate the value against the cost of a decision, project, or policy. It is commonly used to evaluate business or policy decisions (particularly public policy), commercial transactions, and project investments. For example, the U.S. Securities and Exchange Commission must conduct cost–benefit analyses before instituting regulations or deregulations.

1. To determine if an investment (or decision) is sound, ascertaining if – and by how much – its benefits outweigh its costs.
2. To provide a basis for comparing investments (or decisions), comparing the total expected cost of each option with its total expected benefits.

=== Internal rate of return ===
Internal rate of return (IRR) is a method of calculating an investment's rate of return. The term internal refers to the fact that the calculation excludes external factors, such as the risk-free rate, inflation, the cost of capital, or financial risk.

=== Modified internal rate of return ===
The modified internal rate of return (MIRR) is a financial measure of an investment's attractiveness. It is used in capital budgeting to rank alternative investments of unequal size. As the name implies, MIRR is a modification of the internal rate of return (IRR) and as such aims to resolve some problems with the IRR.

=== Payback period ===
Payback period in capital budgeting refers to the time required to recoup the funds expended in an investment, or to reach the break-even point.

=== Equivalent annual cost ===
In finance, the equivalent annual cost (EAC) is the cost per year of owning and operating an asset over its entire lifespan. It is calculated by dividing the negative NPV of a project by the "present value of annuity factor":

$\mathrm{EAC} = -\frac{\mathrm{NPV}}{A_{t,r}}$, where ${A_{t,r}} = \frac{1 - \frac{1}{(1 + r)^t}}{r}$

where r is the annual interest rate and

t is the number of years.

Alternatively, EAC can be obtained by multiplying the NPV of the project by the "loan repayment factor".

EAC is often used as a decision-making tool in capital budgeting when comparing investment projects of unequal lifespans. However, the projects being compared must have equal risk: otherwise, EAC must not be used.

The technique was first discussed in 1923 in engineering literature, and, as a consequence, EAC appears to be a favoured technique employed by engineers, while accountants tend to prefer net present value (NPV) analysis. Such preference has been described as being a matter of professional education, as opposed to an assessment of the actual merits of either method. In the latter group, however, the Society of Management Accountants of Canada endorses EAC, having discussed it as early as 1959 in a published monograph (which was a year before the first mention of NPV in accounting textbooks).

== See also ==
- Profitability index
- Corporate finance § Investment and project valuation
- Expected commercial value
- Financial economics § Corporate finance theory
- First Chicago Method
- Penalized present value
- Valuation (finance) § Valuation of intangible assets
