= Domecelle =

Coordinates: 42.36349°N 7.29455°W

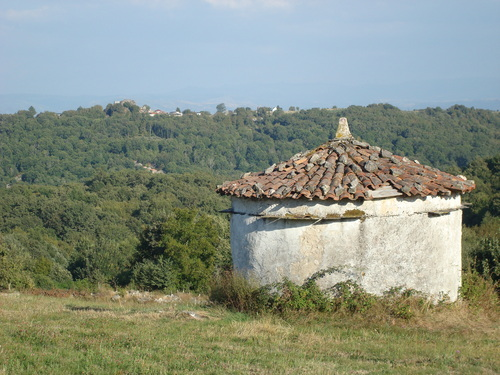

Domecelle is a village in the municipality of San Xoán de Río in Ourense in the Galicia region of north-west Spain. It is located in the north-east of the province.
