= Railroad Gazette =

19th century trade journal

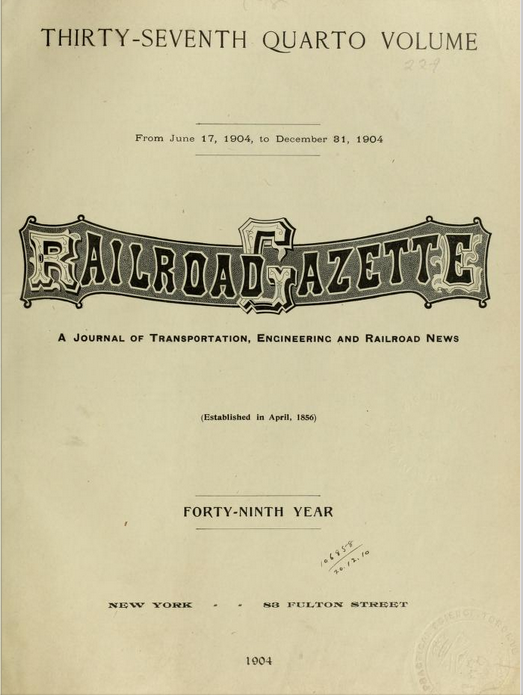
The cover of Railroad Gazette, June 17, 1904 to December 31, 1904.

Railroad Gazette (until 1870, Western Railroad Gazette) was a trade journal that focused on railroad, transportation and engineering topics from 1856 until 1908, when it purchased its main rival and became the publication today known as Railway Age.

== History ==
In April 1856, Stanley C. Fowler, assisted by James J. Schock, began publishing the trade journal Western Railroad Gazette from offices at 128 South Clark Street in Chicago, Illinois. It focused on railroad news, transportation and engineering, and included news and commentary. The publication found an audience among master mechanics, who used it to learn about and discuss railroad management and technology.

In 1870, Fowler sold the journal to Ansel Nash "A.N." Kellogg, who renamed it Railroad Gazette and retained Schock. (Another Railroad Gazette had been established in 1843 in Rogersville, Tennessee; it focused on "internal improvement".)

Later Railroad Gazette editors included Silas Wright Dunning. In the 1870s, the publication was edited by Matthias Nace Forney, who in 1866 had patented a concept for urban elevated railways that "later became the de facto standard for elevated railway service".

From 1884 to early 1887, the publication was edited by Arthur Mellen Wellington, who used it to publish his work The Economic Theory of the Location of Railroads, first as a series of articles in 1876, then as a book in 1877.

The American landscape architect Horace Cleveland contributed articles about tree planting efforts in the western United States.

In June 1908, the publication purchased its chief rival, The Railway Age, founded in 1876 in Chicago. It changed its title to Railroad Age Gazette, then in January 1910, to Railway Age Gazette. In 1918, it became The Railway Age for good.

== Content ==
In February–June 1872, Railroad Gazette published a series of articles written by a person using the pen name "Hindoo", and reader comments in response to the articles. Hindoo was a British colonial official who was visiting the United States, who stated that the Indian railway system very rarely had problems with head-on and rear-end collisions, which were more frequent in the United States. Hindoo proposed that this was due to the manner in which Indian train stations dispatched trains using telegraphs, in which a system was used whereby each train station acted as a "blocking point." This blocking point system was originally devised by the British railroad industry, and forbade trains from leaving a station until a telegraph was received from the next station stating that the line was clear, upon which a clearance card was issued to the train operator. Hindoo felt that the U.S. system placed too much responsibility upon a single dispatcher, who would "oversee all freight and passenger train movements on a division."

Hindoo's articles provided a comparison of safety matters between Indian and American railway systems, comparisons of management systems and styles and comparisons in train dispatching methods. A main contributor to the ongoing discussion was a reader using the pen name "X", and several other readers also responded. In a response, X stated that the U.S. system was less expensive and more efficient compared to British and Indian methods, and posited whether another system could be used that is both cost effective and safe. Additional reader responses generally concurred with X's opinion, but did not provide solid suggestions about how to remedy such problems. One respondent stated that some of the comparisons were faulty as being based upon U.S. railway lines that did not use telegraphic dispatching. This discourse in Railroad Gazette during this time also covered various aspects of problems and flaws in the American railroad system, and potential reforms to remedy these problems.

An article published on April 18, 1884, in Railroad Gazette, written by railroad engineer Horatio Allen and titled "The First Railroad in America", states that the author (Allen) was the operator of the first locomotive run in the United States on a railroad. Allen stated that on August 9, 1829, he ran a locomotive named Stourbridge Lion in Pennsylvania "three miles and back over rails of wood upon which bar iron 2 ¼ inches wide and 1 ½ inch thick was spiked down".

Railroad Gazette reported about the electrification of the Erie Railroad's Rochester Division.

== Selected works ==
- Armstrong, Henry E. (September 16, 1904). "Early Transportation in New York". Railroad Gazette, Volume 37, No. 14.
- A list of accessible Railroad Gazette issues may be accessed at Railroad gazette, published by the HathiTrust Digital Library.

== See also ==
- List of American rail transport magazines
