= Profitability index =

Mathematical economic formula

Profitability index (PI), also known as profit investment ratio (PIR) and value investment ratio (VIR), is the ratio of payoff to investment of a proposed project. It is a useful tool for ranking projects because it allows you to quantify the amount of value created per unit of investment. Under capital rationing, PI method is suitable because PI method indicates relative figure i.e. ratio instead of absolute figure.

The ratio is calculated as follows:

- $\text{Profitability index} = \frac{\text{PV of future cash flows}}{\text{Initial investment}} = 1 + \frac{\text{NPV}}{\text{Initial investment}}$

Assuming that the cash flow calculated does not include the investment made in the project, a profitability index of 1 indicates break-even. Any value lower than one would indicate that the project's present value (PV) is less than the initial investment. As the value of the profitability index increases, so does the financial attractiveness of the proposed project.

The PI is similar to the Return on Investment (ROI), except that the net profit is discounted.

== Example ==
We assume an investment opportunity with the following characteristics:

- Investment = $40,000
- Life of the Machine = 5 Years

CFAT Year      CFAT

      1        18000
      2        12000
      3        10000
      4         9000
      5         6000

Calculate Net present value at 6% and PI:

     Year      CFAT      PV@10%       PV

      1        18000      0.909      16362 
      2        12000      0.827       9924   
      3        10000      0.752       7520
      4         9000      0.683       6147     
      5         6000      0.621       3726
              Total present value    43679
              (-) Investment         40000
                         NPV           3679

     PI = 43679/40000 = 1.092 > 1 ⇒ Accept the project

== See also ==
- Net present value
