= Chandrexa de Queixa =

- Municipality
- Coat of arms

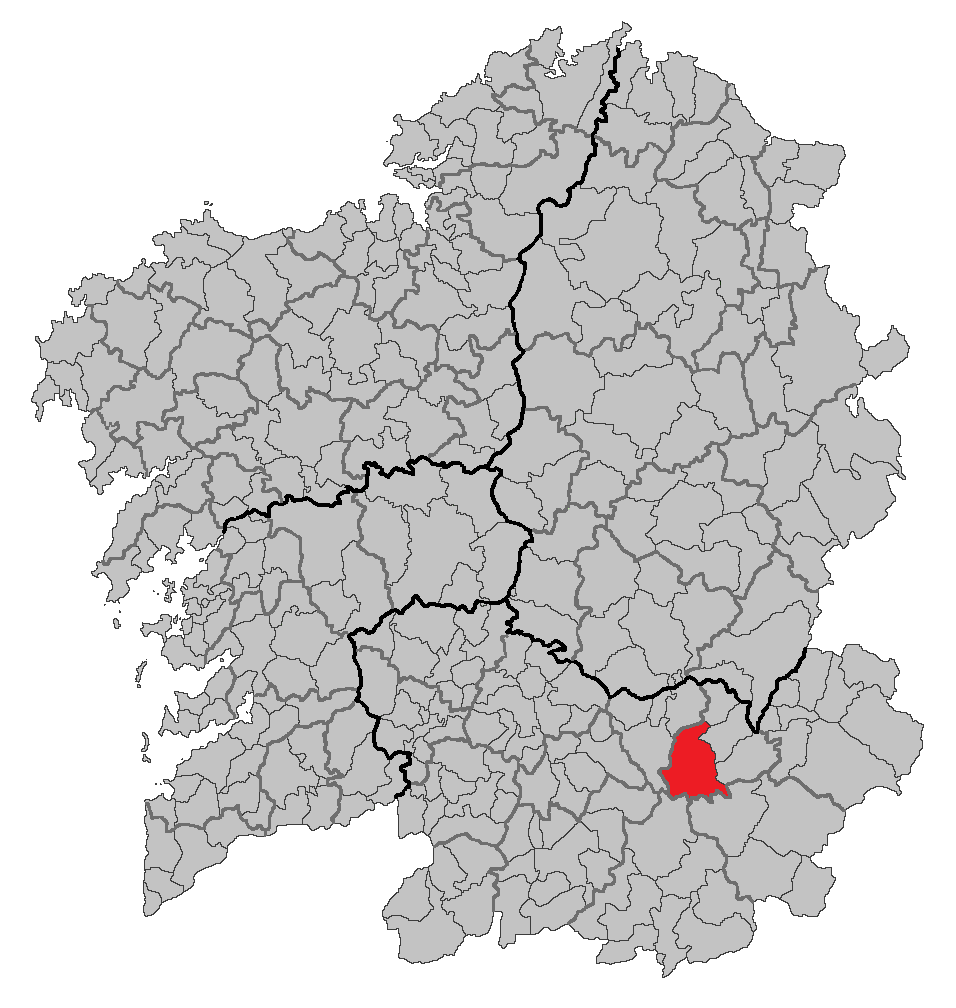
- Location in Galicia

- Location in Spain
- Coordinates: 42°14′25″N 7°25′34″W
- Country: Spain
- Autonomous community: Galicia
- Province: Ourense
- Comarca: Terra de Trives

Government
  - Mayor: Francisco Rodríguez Rodríguez (PPdeG)

Area
  - Total: 171.8 km^{2} (66.3 sq mi)
- Elevation: 985 m (3,232 ft)

Population (2025-01-01)
  - Total: 467
  - Density: 2.72/km^{2} (7.04/sq mi)
- Time zone: UTC+1 (CET)
  - Summer (DST): UTC+2 (CEST)
- INE municipality code: www.chandrexadequeixa.es/index.php/Es/

Chandrexa de Queixa is a municipality in the northeast of the province of Ourense, in the autonomous community of Galicia, Spain. It belongs to the comarca of Terra de Trives.
