= Accounting rate of return =

Financial ratio

The accounting rate of return, also known as average rate of return, or ARR, is a financial ratio used in capital budgeting. The ratio does not take into account the concept of time value of money. ARR calculates the return, generated to net income of the proposed capital investment. The ARR is a percentage return. Say, if ARR = 7%, then it means that the project is expected to earn seven cents out of each dollar invested (yearly). If the ARR is equal to or greater than the required rate of return, the project is acceptable. If it is less than the desired rate, it should be rejected. When comparing investments, the higher the ARR, the more attractive the investment. More than half of large firms calculate ARR when appraising projects.

The key advantage of ARR is that it is easy to compute and understand. The main disadvantage of ARR is that it disregards the time factor in terms of time value of money or risks for long term investments. The ARR is built on evaluation of profits, and it can be easily manipulated with changes in depreciation methods. The ARR can give misleading information when evaluating investments of different size.

== Basic formulas ==
$$\text{ARR} = \frac{\text{Average return during period}}{\text{Average investment}}$$

where:

$$\text{Average investment} = \frac{\text{Book value at beginning of year 1 + Book value at end of useful life}}{\text{2}}$$

$$\mbox{Average return during period} = {\mbox{Incremental revenue} -\mbox{ Incremental expenses (including depreciation)}\over \mbox{Number of Years}}$$

$$\mbox{Average profit} = {\mbox{Profit after tax}\over \mbox{Life of investment}}$$

== Pitfalls ==
1. This technique is based on profits rather than cash flow. It ignores cash flow from investment. Therefore, it can be affected by non-cash items such as bad debts and depreciation when calculating profits. The change of methods for depreciation can be manipulated and lead to higher profits.
2. This technique does not adjust for the risk to long term forecasts.
3. ARR doesn't take into account the time value of money.

== See also ==
- Average accounting return
