= Conner Searcy =

American private equity investor

- Born: c. 1975 (age 50–51); United States
- Citizenship: American
- Education: Harvard Business School (MBA), Vanderbilt University (BA)
- Occupation: Private equity investor
- Known for: Co-founder of Trive Capital
- Spouse: Ginny Searcy

Conner Searcy is an American private equity investor who is the co-Founder and Managing Partner of Trive Capital, a Dallas-based private equity firm that focuses on middle-market investments across North America.

== Early life and education ==
Searcy obtained a bachelor's degree from Vanderbilt University and an MBA from Harvard Business School.

In 2024, Conner Searcy formed Audare Legacy Partners whose primary mission is strategic philanthropy. Conner and his wife Ginny (Vanderbilt University alumni) established a dean’s chair at the College of Arts and Science. The endowed position was named the Ginny and Conner Searcy Dean’s Chair, with dean John Geer serving as its first holder. They also endowed the Searcy Family Scholarship to support College of Arts and Science students.

== Career ==
Earlier in his career, he worked at Stonegate Capital, a middle-market buyout firm, and at Bain & Company. He went on to became a partner at Insight Equity, a private equity firm.

In 2012 he founded Trive Capital. Under Searcy's leadership, Trive has raised institutional funds with $8.5 billion of assets under management, including Trive Capital Fund V, which closed in 2025 with approximately $2.7 billion in commitments.
