= Terra de Trives =

A Terra de Trives
- Comarca
- Flag Coat of arms
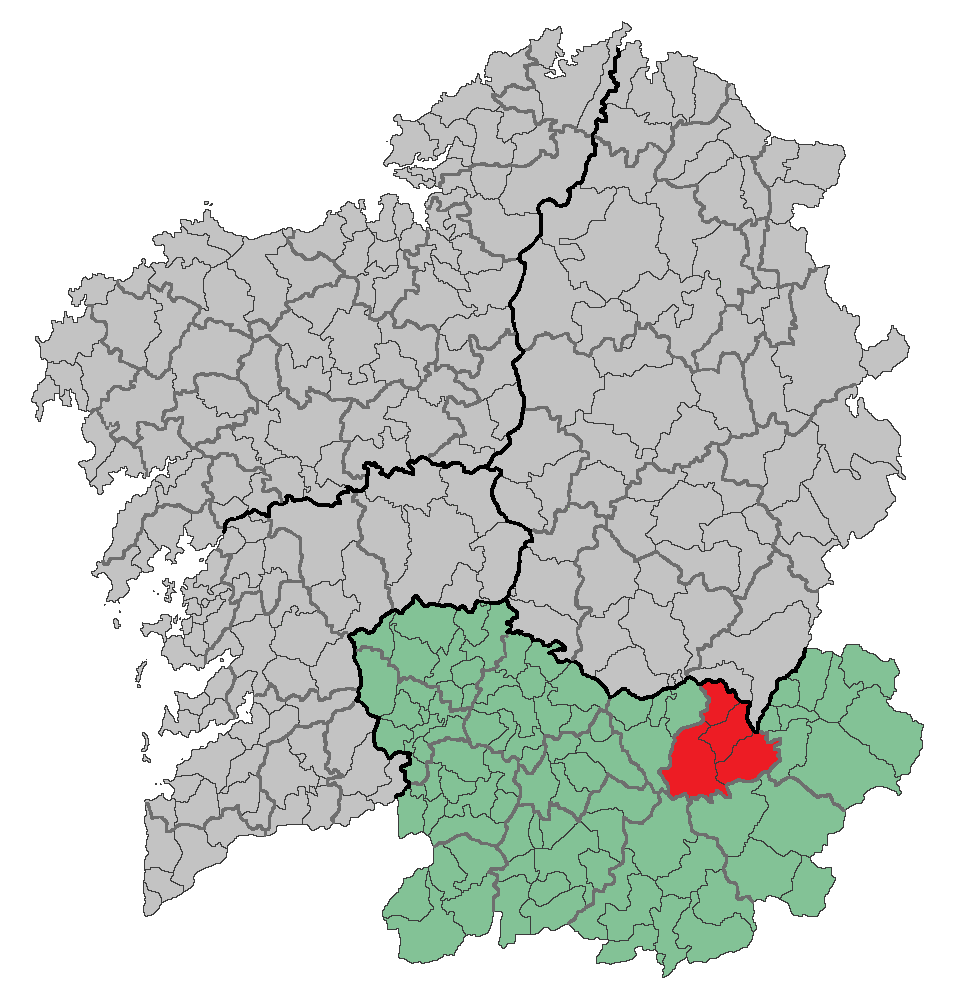
- Coordinates: 42.3394°N 7.2531°W
- Country: Spain
- Autonomous community: Galicia
- Province: Ourense
- Capital: A Pobra de Trives
- Municipalities: List: Chandrexa de Queixa, Manzaneda, A Pobra de Trives, San Xoán de Río

Area
  - Total: 431.71 km^{2} (166.68 sq mi)

Population (2019)
  - Total: 3,924
  - Density: 9.089/km^{2} (23.54/sq mi)
- Time zone: UTC+1 (CET)
  - Summer (DST): UTC+2 (CEST)

A Terra de Trives is a comarca in the Galician Province of Ourense. The overall population of this local region is 3,924 (2019).

== Municipalities ==
Chandrexa de Queixa, Manzaneda, A Pobra de Trives and San Xoán de Río.
