= Debt capital =

Capital that a business raises by taking out a loan

Debt capital is the capital that a business raises by taking out a loan. It is a loan made to a company, typically as growth capital, and is normally repaid at some future date. Debt capital differs from equity or share capital because subscribers to debt capital do not become part owners of the business, but are merely creditors, and the suppliers of debt capital usually receive a contractually fixed annual percentage return on their loan, and this is known as the coupon rate. However, sometimes the loan is paid back based on a percentage of the company's monthly revenue instead of a fixed interest rate, such as the case with revenue-based financing.

Debt capital ranks higher than equity capital for the repayment of annual returns. This means that legally the interest on debt capital must be repaid in full before any dividends are paid to any suppliers of equity. Likewise, in dissolution, repayment to debt holders ranks higher than distributions to preference holders and equity holders. Equity holders (shareholders) have all rights in the business, but the debt holders have no rights in the business.

A company that is highly geared (UK), or leveraged (US), has a high debt-to-equity capital ratio.
