= Sobrado, A Pobra de Trives =

Parish in Ourense, Galicia, Spain

Coordinates: 42.316°N 7.239°W

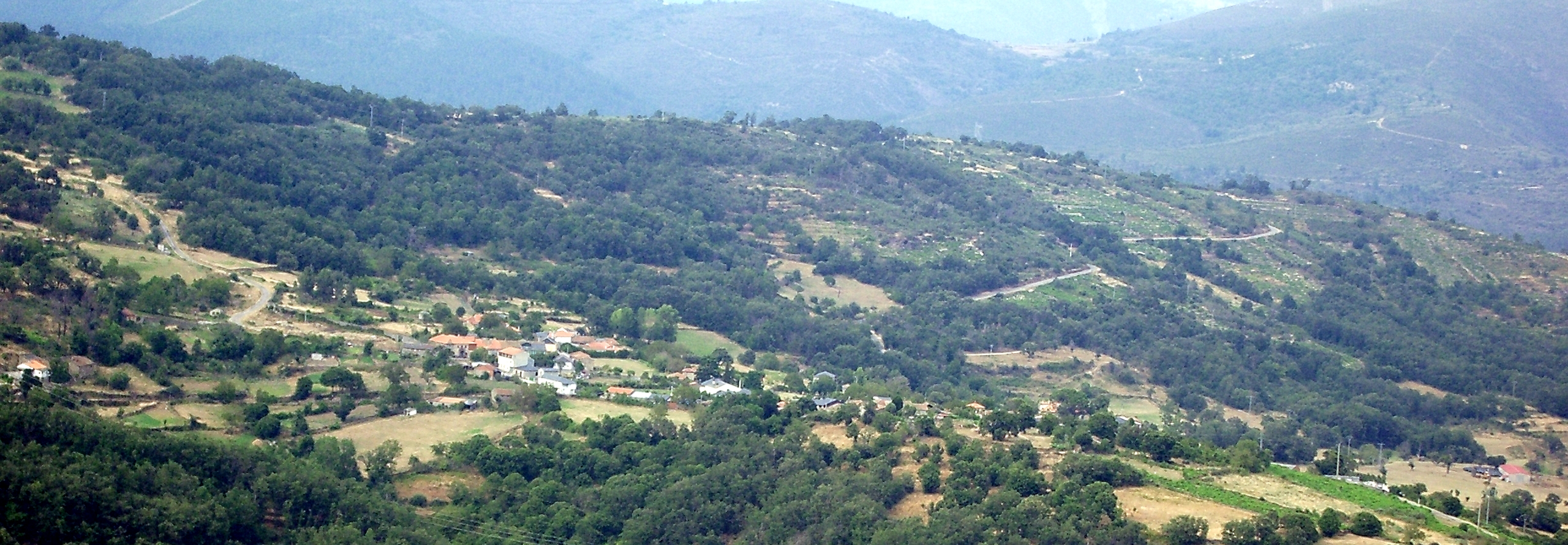
Panorimical view of the parish Sobrado de Trives

Sobrado (San Salvador) is a parish in A Pobra de Trives municipality, Ourense province, Galicia region of north-west Spain. It lies towards the north-east of the province.

As of 2008, the population of Sobrado was 92 (43 males).

== Images ==
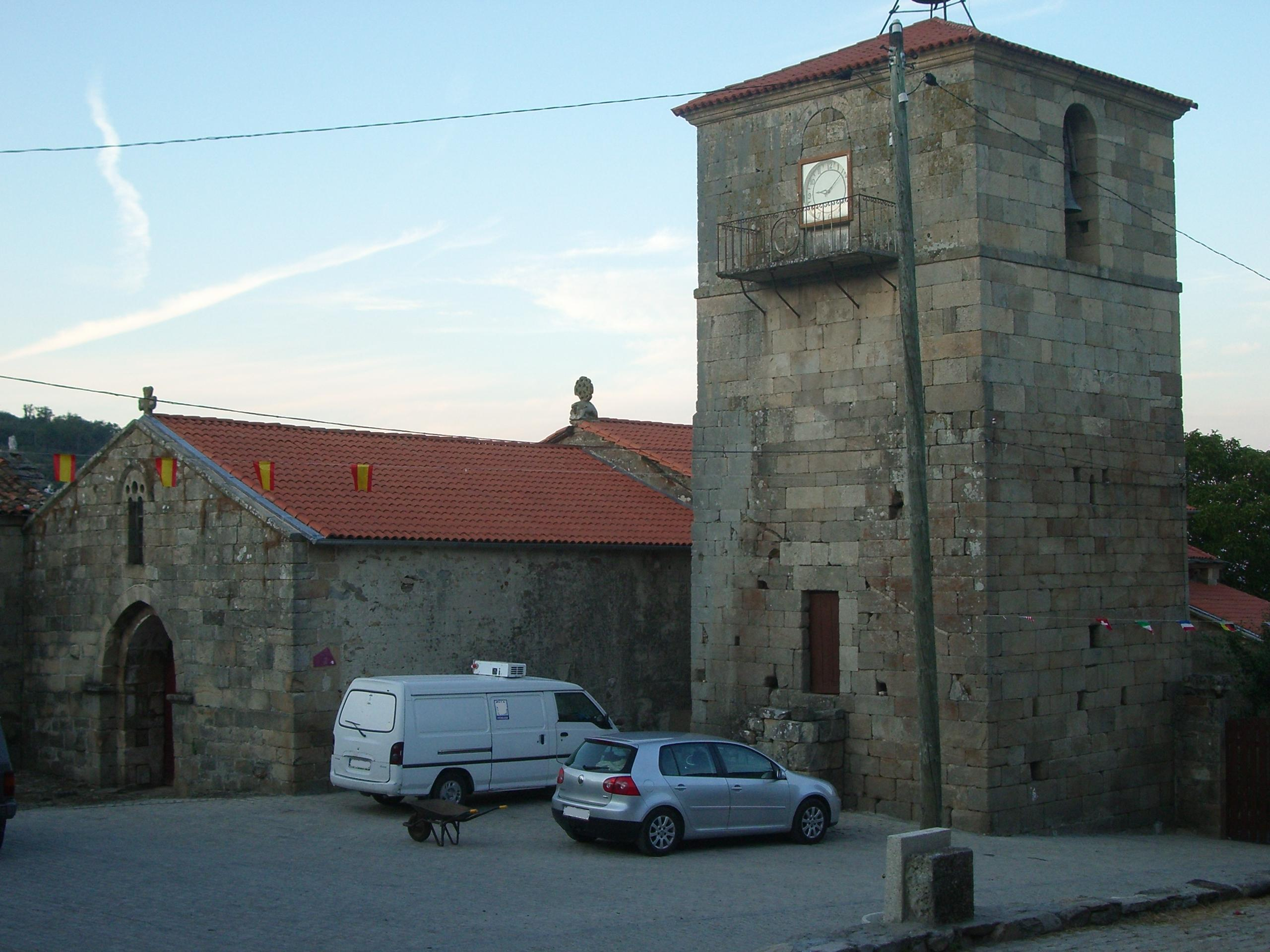
Church and tower of the parish Sobrado de Trives

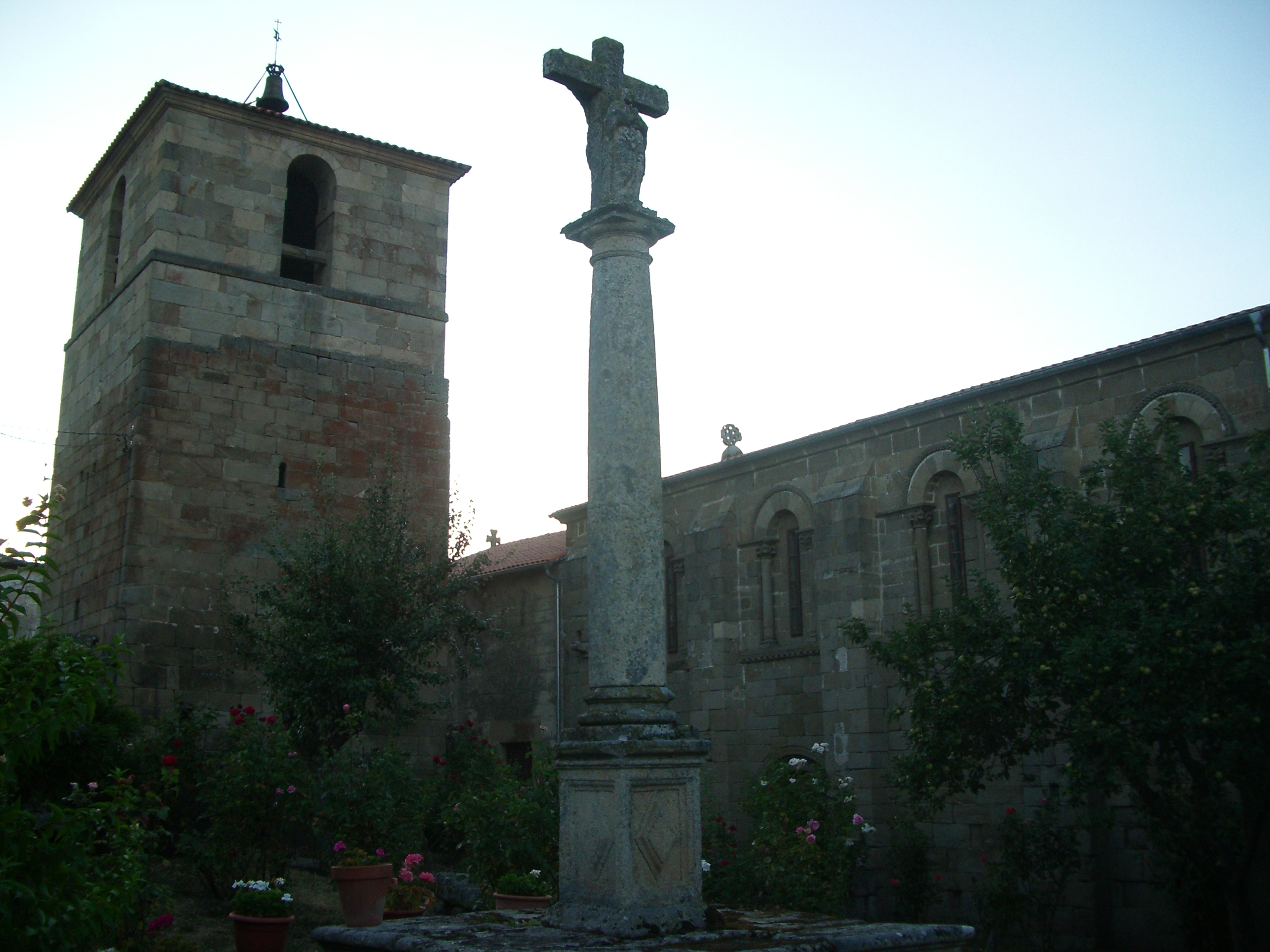
Cross (16th century) and parish church of San Salvador de Sobrado de Trives (12th century)

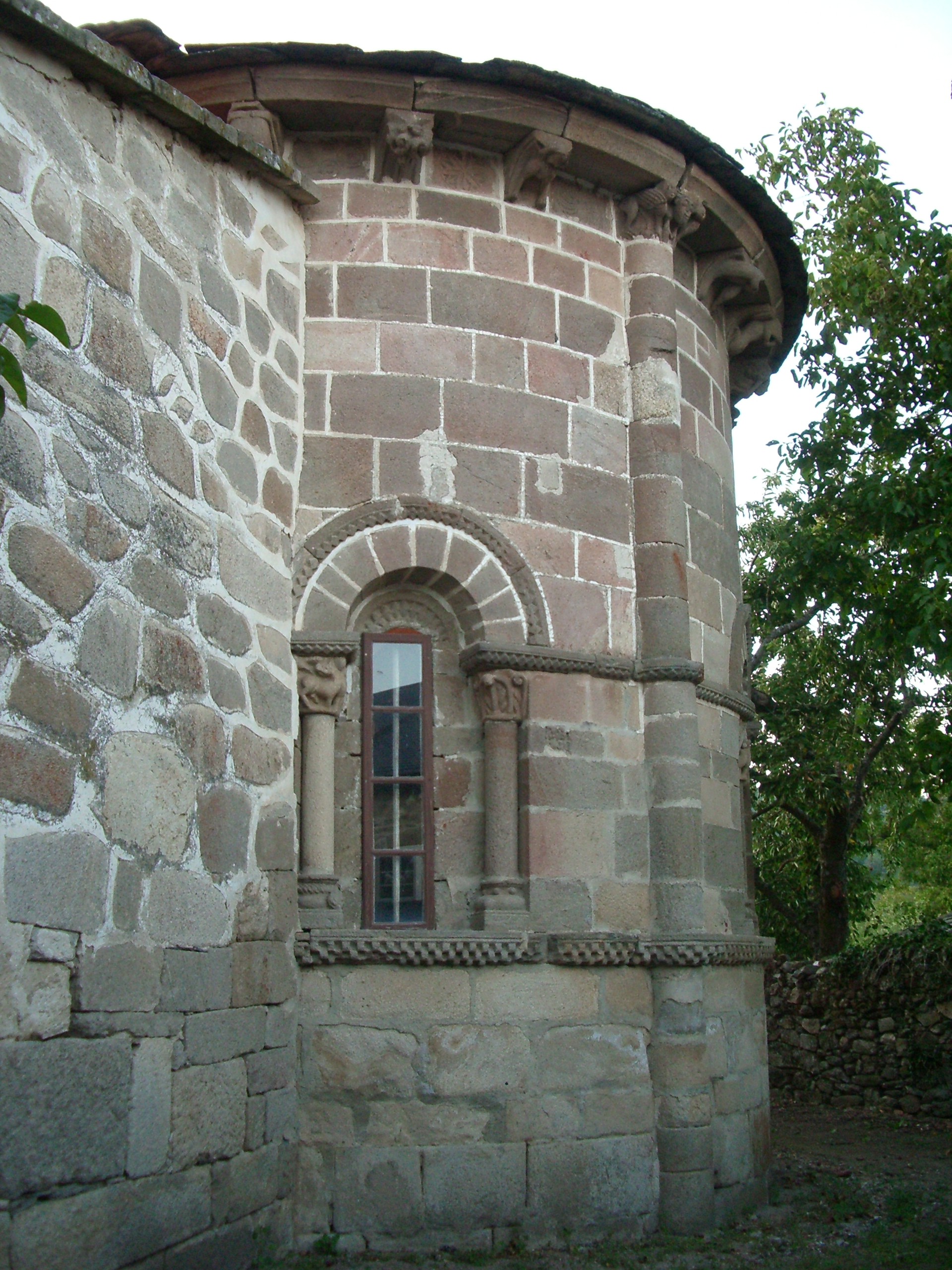
Apse of parish church of San Salvador de Sobrado de Trives (12th century)
