= Engineering economics (civil engineering) =

The study of Engineering Economics in Civil Engineering, also known generally as engineering economics, or alternatively engineering economy, is a subset of economics, more specifically, microeconomics. It is defined as a "guide for the economic selection among technically feasible alternatives for the purpose of a rational allocation of scarce resources." Its goal is to guide entities, private or public, that are confronted with the fundamental problem of economics.

This fundamental problem of economics consists of two questions that must be answered: what objectives should be pursued, and how should they be achieved? Economics, as a social science, answers those questions and is defined as the knowledge used to select among "...technically feasible alternatives for the purpose of a rational allocation of scarce resources." Correspondingly, all problems involving "...profit-maximizing or cost-minimizing are engineering problems with economic objectives and are properly described by the label "engineering economy".

As a subdiscipline practiced by civil engineers, engineering economics narrows the definition of the fundamental economic problem and related questions to that of problems related to the investment of capital, public or private, in a broad array of infrastructure projects. Civil engineers confront a more specialized form of the fundamental problem: inadequate economic evaluation of engineering projects. Civil engineers under constant pressure to deliver infrastructure effectively and efficiently confront complex problems associated with allocating scarce resources for ensuring quality, mitigating risk and controlling project delivery. Civil engineers must be educated to recognize the role played by engineering economics as part of the evaluations occurring at each phase in the project lifecycle.

Thus, the application of engineering economics in the practice of civil engineering focuses on the decision-making process, its context, and environment in project execution and delivery. It is pragmatic by nature, integrating microeconomic theory with civil engineering practice but it is also a simplified application of economic theory in that it avoids a number of microeconomic concepts such as price determination, competition and supply and demand.

This poses new, underlying economic problems in resource allocation for civil engineers delivering infrastructure projects, specifically for project management, planning, and control functions.

Civil engineers address these fundamental economic problems using specialized engineering economics knowledge as a framework for continuously "... probing economic feasibility...using a stage-wise approach..." throughout the project lifecycle. The application of this specialized civil engineering knowledge can be in the form of engineering analyses of life-cycle cost, cost accounting, cost of capital and the economic feasibility of engineering solutions for design, construction and project management. The civil engineer must have the ability to use engineering economy methodologies for the "formulation of objectives, specification of alternatives, prediction of outcomes" and estimation of minimum acceptability for investment and optimization.

They must also be capable of integrating these economic considerations into appropriate engineering solutions and management plans that predictably meet project stakeholder expectations in a sustainable manner.

The civil engineering profession plays a special role in our society and economy, where investing substantial sums in public infrastructure requires "...some assurance that it will perform its intended function."

Thus, the civil engineer, exercising their professional judgment in making decisions about fundamental problems, relies on the profession's knowledge of engineering economics to provide "the practical certainty" that makes the social investment in public infrastructure feasible.

== Course of Instruction ==
Historically, coursework and curricula in engineering economics for civil engineers has focused on capital budgeting: "...when to replace capital equipment, and which of several alternative investments to make.

== Journals ==
- The Engineering Economist - published jointly by the Engineering Economy Division of the American Society of Engineering Education (ASEE) and the Institute of Industrial and Systems Engineers (IISE). It publishes "...original research, current practice, and teaching involving problems of capital investment."

== See also ==
- American Society of Civil Engineers
- Cost–benefit analysis
- Social discount rate
