= A Pobra de Trives =

- Municipality
- Coat of arms

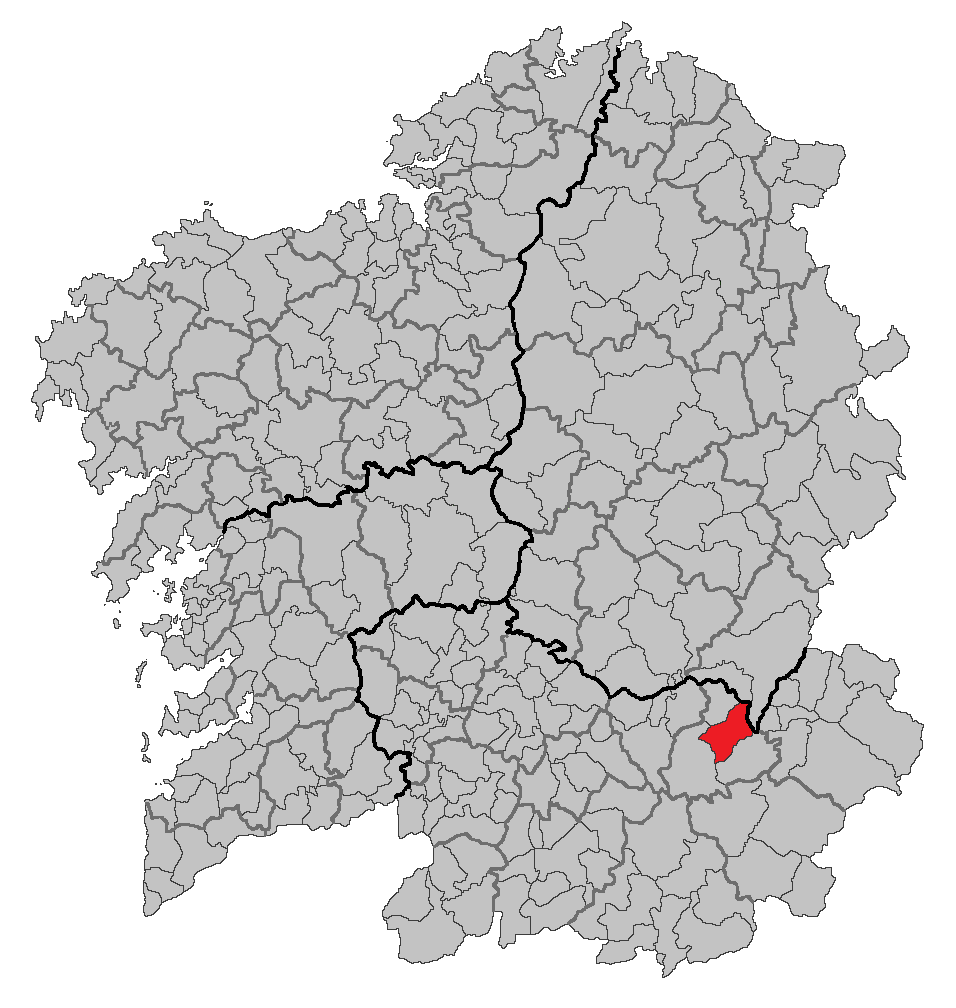
- Location in Galicia

- Location in Spain
- Coordinates: 42°20′22″N 7°15′11″W
- Country: Spain
- Autonomous community: Galicia
- Province: Ourense
- Comarca: Terra de Trives

Government
  - Mayor: Francisco José Fernández Blanco

Area
  - Total: 84.2 km^{2} (32.5 sq mi)
- Elevation: 746 m (2,448 ft)

Population (2025-01-01)
  - Total: 1,929
  - Density: 22.9/km^{2} (59.3/sq mi)
- Time zone: UTC+1 (CET)
  - Summer (DST): UTC+2 (CEST)
- Postal Code: 32780
- Website: www.apobradetrives.es

A Pobra de Trives is a municipality in the northeast of the province of Ourense, in the autonomous community of Galicia, Spain. It belongs to the comarca of Terra de Trives.

== Parishes ==
- Barrio (San Xoán)
- O Castro (San Nicolao)
- Cotarós (Santiago)
- Cova (Santa María)
- A Encomenda (Santo Antonio)
- Mendoia (Nosa Sra. da Concepción)
- Navea (San Miguel)
- Pareisás (Santo Antonio)
- Pena Folenche (Santa María)
- Pena Petada (Santo Estevo)
- Piñeiro (San Sebastián)
- A Pobra de Trives (Sto. Cristo da Misericordia)
- San Lourenzo de Trives (San Lourenzo)
- San Mamede de Trives (San Mamede)
- Sobrado (San Salvador)
- Somoza (San Miguel)
- Trives (Santa María)
- Vilanova (Santa María)
- Xunqueira (San Pedro)
