= Rate of return on a portfolio =

Ratio of net portfolio earnings

The rate of return on a portfolio is the ratio of the net gain or loss (which is the total of net income, foreign currency appreciation and capital gain, whether realized or not) which a portfolio generates, relative to the size of the portfolio. It is measured over a period of time, commonly a year.

== Calculation ==
The rate of return on a portfolio can be calculated either directly or indirectly, depending the particular type of data available.

=== Direct historical measurement ===
Direct historical measurement of the rate of return on a portfolio applies one of several alternative methods, such as for example the time-weighted return or the modified Dietz method. It requires knowledge of the value of the portfolio at the start and end of the period of time under measurement, together with the external flows of value into and out of the portfolio at various times within the time period. For the time-weighted method, it is also necessary to know the value of the portfolio when these flows occur (i.e. either immediately after, or immediately before).

=== Indirect calculation ===
The rate of return on a portfolio can be calculated indirectly as the weighted average rate of return on the various assets within the portfolio. The weights are proportional to the value of the assets within the portfolio, to take into account what portion of the portfolio each individual return represents in calculating the contribution of that asset to the return on the portfolio.

This method is particularly useful for projecting into the future the rate of return on a portfolio, given projections of the rates of return on the constituents of the portfolio.

The indirect calculation of the rate of return on a portfolio can be expressed by the formula:

$$r=A_1r_1+A_2r_2+\cdots+A_nr_n$$

which is the sum of the contributions $A_1r_1$, $A_2r_2\cdots A_nr_n$ where:

$r$ equals the rate of return on the portfolio,
$A_i$ equals the weight of asset i in the portfolio, and
$r_i$ equals the rate of return on asset i in the portfolio.

==== Example ====
- Rate of return r_{m} on a mining stock equals 10%
- Rate of return r_{c} on a child care centre equals 8%
- Rate of return r_{f} on a fishing company equals 12%

Now suppose that 40% of the portfolio is in the mining stock (weighting for this stock A_{m} = 40%), 40% is in the child care centre (weighting for this stock A_{c} = 40%) and the remaining 20% is in the fishing company (weighting for this stock A_{f} = 20%). To determine the rate of return on this portfolio, first calculate the contribution of each asset to the return on the portfolio, by multiplying the weighting of each asset by its rate of return, and then add these contributions together:

- For the mining stock, its weighting is 40% and its rate of return is 10% so its contribution equals 40% x 10% = .04 = 4%
- For the child care centre, its weighting is 40% and its rate of return is 8% so its contribution equals 40% x 8% = .032 = 3.2%
- For the fishing company, its weighting is 20% and its rate of return is 12% so its contribution equals 20% x 12% = .024 = 2.4%

Adding together these percentage contributions gives 4% + 3.2% + 2.4% = 9.6%, resulting in a rate of return on this portfolio of 9.6%.

==== Negative weights ====
The weight $A_i$ of a particular asset in a portfolio can be negative, as in the case of a liability such as a loan or a short position, inside a portfolio with positive overall value. In such a case, the contribution $A_i r_i$ to the portfolio return will have the opposite sign to the return.

===== Example =====
A portfolio contains a cash account holding US$2,000 at the beginning of the period. The same portfolio also contains a US$1,000 loan at the start of the period. The net value of the portfolio at the beginning of the period is 2,000 - 1,000 = US$1,000.

At the end of the period, 1 percent interest has accrued on the cash account, and 5 percent has accrued on the loan. There have been no transactions over the period.

The weight $A_1$ of the cash account in the portfolio is 200 percent, and the weight $A_2$ of the loan is -100 percent. The contribution from the cash account is therefore 2 × 1 percent, and the contribution from the loan is -1 × 5 percent. Although the loan liability has grown, so it has a positive return, its contribution is negative. The total portfolio return is 2 - 5 = -3 percent.

==== Negative net assets ====
In cases where the overall net value of the portfolio is greater than zero, then the weight of a liability within the portfolio, such as a borrowing or a short position, is negative. Conversely, in cases where the overall net asset value of the portfolio is less than zero, i.e. the liabilities outweigh the assets, the weights are turned on their heads, and the weights of the liabilities are positive, and the weights of the assets are negative.

===== Example =====
The owner of an investment portfolio borrows US$200,000 from the bank to invest in securities. The portfolio suffers losses, and the owner sells all its holdings. These trades, plus interest paid on the loan, leave US$100,000 cash. The net asset value of the portfolio is 100,000 - 200,000 = -100,000 USD.

Going forward into the next period, the weight of the loan is -200,000/-100,000 = +200 percent, and the weight of the cash remaining is +100,000/-100,000 = -100 percent.

==== Returns in the case of negative net assets ====
If a portfolio has negative net assets, i.e. it is a net liability, then a positive return on the portfolio net assets indicates the growth of the net liability, i.e. a further loss.

===== Example =====
US$10,000 interest is accrued on a US$200,000 loan borrowed from a bank. The liability has grown 10,000/200,000 = 5 percent. The return is positive, even though the borrower has lost US$10,000, instead of gained.

==== Contributions in the case of negative net assets ====
A positive contribution to return on negative net assets indicates a loss. It will be associated either with a positive weight combined with a positive return, indicating a loss on a liability, or a negative weight combined with a negative return, indicating a loss on an asset.

=== Discrepancies ===
If there are any external flows or other transactions on the assets in the portfolio during the period of measurement, and also depending on the methodology used for calculating the returns and weights, discrepancies may arise between the direct measurement of the rate of return on a portfolio, and indirect measurement (described above).

== See also ==
- Investment management
- Modified Dietz method
- Profit (accounting)
- Return on capital
- Risk-adjusted return on capital
- Time-weighted return
