= Holding period return =

In finance, holding period return (HPR) is the return on an asset or portfolio over the whole period during which it was held. It is one of the simplest and most important measures of investment performance.

HPR is the change in value of an investment, asset or portfolio over a particular period. It is the entire gain or loss, which is the sum income and capital gains, divided by the value at the beginning of the period.

HPR = (End Value - Initial Value) / Initial Value

where the End Value includes income, such as dividends, earned on the investment:

$$HPR_n \ = \ \frac{Income + P_{n+1} - P_n}{P_n}$$

where $P_n$ is the value at the start of the holding period and $Income + P_{n+1}$ is the total value at the end of the holding period.

== Annualizing the holding period return ==
=== Over multiple years ===
To annualize a holding period return means to find the equivalent rate of return per year. Assuming income and capital gains and losses are reinvested, i.e. retained in the portfolio, then:

$$\text {Annualized rate of return} = \left( \frac {\text{end value}} {\text {initial value}} \right) ^ \frac {1}{t} - 1$$

$$=\left(\text {holding-period return} + 1 \right)^{\frac{1}{t}} - 1$$

t being the length of the holding period, measured in years. For example, if you have held the item for half a year, t would equal 1/2, so 1/t would equal 2. (However, investment performance professionals generally advise against quoting annualized return over a holding period of less than a year).

=== From quarterly holding period returns ===
To calculate an annual HPR from four quarterly HPRs, it is necessary to know whether income is reinvested within each quarter or not. If HPR1 through HPR4 are the holding period returns for four consecutive periods, assuming that income is reinvested, the annual HPR obeys the relation:

$1+HPR=\left(1+HPR_{1}\right)\left(1+HPR_{2}\right)\left(1+HPR_{3}\right)\left(1+HPR_{4}\right)$

==== Example with income not reinvested ====
Example: Stock with low volatility and a regular quarterly dividend, assuming the dividends are not reinvested.
End of:	1st Quarter	2nd Quarter	3rd Quarter	4th Quarter
Dividend	$1	$1	$1	$1
Stock Price	$98	$101	$102	$99
Quarterly HPR	-1%	4.08%	1.98%	-1.96%
Annual HPR				3%

To the right is an example of a stock investment of one share purchased at the beginning of the year for $100. Assume dividends are not reinvested. At the end of the first quarter the stock price is $98. The stock share bought for $100 can only be sold for $98, which is the value of the investment at the end of the first quarter. This is less than the purchase price, so the investment has suffered a capital loss. The first quarter holding period return is:

($98 – $100 + $1) / $100 = -1%

Since the final stock price at the end of the year is $99, the annual holding period return is:

($99 ending price - $100 beginning price + $4 dividends) / $100 beginning price = 3%

If the final stock price had been $95, the annual HPR would be:

($95 ending price - $100 beginning price + $4 dividends) / $100 beginning price = -1%.

== See also ==
- Accounting rate of return
- Capital budgeting
- Discounted cash flow
- Internal rate of return
- Modified Dietz method
- Modified internal rate of return
- Net present value
- Rate of return
- Simple Dietz method
- Marginal efficiency of capital
- Return on investment
