= Capital call =

Finance term, also known as a drawdown

A capital call (also known as a drawdown or a capital commitment) is a legal right of an investment firm or an insurance firm to demand a portion of the money promised to it by an investor. A capital call fund would be the money that had been committed to the fund. The capital call is the act of actually transferring the promised funds to the investment target. A capital call agreement defines capital call terms.

For example, when an investor buys into a real estate fund, that fund's managers may wait some time before using the investor's money to buy real estate, either because they are waiting for real estate prices to be favorable, or because they are researching new deals. When they are ready to buy real estate, the fund managers issue a capital call, requiring investors who have committed money to the fund to transfer that money over.

The fund might also borrow funds instead of using the investor's money. This allows the fund to benefit from leverage. The financing of the real estate purchase is realized through borrowing from banks. When the fund has reached a certain level of return, capital calls are issued and the borrowing is paid off.
