= TWR =

TWR may mean:

- Tom Walkinshaw Racing, a racing team and engineering company founded in 1976
- Trans World Radio, a multinational Christian evangelistic broadcaster
- Traveling wave reactor, a type of nuclear reactor that would convert fertile material into fissile fuel
- Tokyo Waterfront Area Rapid Transit, Japan
- Thrust-to-Weight Ratio of an aircraft or spaceship engine.
- Time-weighted return is a method of calculating investment return.
- Tuas West Road MRT station, Mass Rapid Transit station in Singapore, MRT station abbreviation
- Tyne and Wear, county in England, Chapman code
- Thousand Week Reich, a mod for the computer wargame Hearts of Iron IV
