= Abnormal return =

Difference between an investment's actual and expected returns

In finance, an abnormal return is the difference between the actual return of a security and the expected return. Abnormal returns are sometimes triggered by "events." Events can include mergers, dividend announcements, company earning announcements, interest rate increases, lawsuits, etc. all of which can contribute to an abnormal return. Events in finance can typically be classified as information or occurrences that have not already been priced by the market.

== Stock market ==
In stock market trading, abnormal returns are the differences between a single stock or portfolio's performance and the expected return over a set period of time. Usually a broad index, such as the S&P 500 or a national index like the Nikkei 225, is used as a benchmark to determine the expected return. For example, if a stock increased by 5% because of some news that affected the stock price, but the average market only increased by 3% and the stock has a beta of 1, then the abnormal return was 2% (5% - 3% = 2%). If the market average performs better (after adjusting for beta) than the individual stock, then the abnormal return will be negative.

$$\textrm{Abnormal}\ \textrm{Return} = \textrm{Actual}\ \textrm{Return} - \textrm{Expected} \ \textrm{Return}$$

== Calculation ==
The calculation formula for the abnormal returns is as follows:

$AR_{it}=R_{it}-E(R_{it})$

where:

AR_{it} - abnormal return for firm i on day t

R_{it} - actual return for firm i on day t

E(R_{it}) – expected return for firm i on day t

A common practice is to standardise the abnormal returns with the use of the following formula:

$SAR_{it}=AR_{it}/SD_{it}$

where:

SAR_{it} - standardised abnormal returns

SD_{it} – standard deviation of the abnormal returns

The SD_{it} is calculated with the use of the following formula:

$SD_{it}=[S_i^2*(1+\frac{1}{T}*\frac{(R_{mt}-R_m)^2}{\textstyle \sum_{t=1}^T \displaystyle(R_{mt}-R_m)^2})]^{0,5}$

where:

S_{i}^{2} – the residual variance for firm i,

R_{mt} – the return on the stock market index on day t,

R_{m} – the average return from the market portfolio in the estimation period,

T – the numbers of days in the estimation period.

== Cumulative abnormal return ==
Cumulative abnormal return, or CAR, is the sum of all abnormal returns. Cumulative Abnormal Returns are usually calculated over small windows, often only days. This is because evidence has shown that compounding daily abnormal returns can create bias in the results.

== See also ==
- Market value
- Rate of return
