= Investment performance =

Investment performance is the return on an investment portfolio, which can contain a single asset or multiple assets.

== Types ==
=== Single asset ===
A single-asset investor will only hold one kind of stock, unlike multiple asset investors. The single-investor fund structure often is investor run. Single-investor funds often are requested, or even required, by investors seeking a kind of structure.

=== Multiple asset ===
Multi-asset class investments increase the diversification of an overall portfolio by having multiple investments throughout different classes, reducing risks like volatility. A multi-asset class investor might hold stocks, bonds, cash, and real property.

== See also ==
- Absolute investment performance
- Absolute return
- Financial risk management § Investment management
- Holding period return
- Modified Dietz Method
- Internal Rate of Return
- Rate of return
- Relative return
- Risk-adjusted return on capital
- Simple Dietz Method

== Measurement and presentation ==
Investment performance is commonly measured using rates of return over a specified period. Time-weighted returns are used to reduce the effect of external cash flows controlled by the investor, while money-weighted returns reflect the timing and size of cash flows into and out of the portfolio. Performance may also be presented before or after fees, since fees and expenses reduce investment returns and affect the amount received by the investor.

Performance figures are often compared with a benchmark, peer group, or stated investment objective to evaluate whether an investment manager or portfolio has added value relative to an alternative measure. The Global Investment Performance Standards provide voluntary standards for calculating and presenting investment performance to clients and prospective clients, with the aim of improving comparability and consistency across investment firms.
