= Expected return =

Expected gain on a financial investment

The expected return (or expected gain) on a financial investment is the expected value of its return (of the profit on the investment). It is a measure of the center of the distribution of the random variable that is the return. It is calculated by using the following formula:

$$E[R]= \sum_{i=1}^{n}R_{i}P_{i}$$

where

$R_{i}$ is the return in scenario $i$;
$P_{i}$ is the probability for the return $R_{i}$ in scenario $i$; and
$n$ is the number of scenarios.

The expected rate of return is the expected return per currency unit (e.g., dollar) invested. It is computed as the expected return divided by the amount invested. The required rate of return is what an investor would require to be compensated for the risk borne by holding the asset; "expected return" is often used in this sense, as opposed to the more formal, mathematical, sense above.

== Application ==
Although the above represents what one expects the return to be, it only refers to the long-term average. In the short term, any of the various scenarios could occur.

For example, if one knew a given investment had a 50% chance of earning a return of $10, a 25% chance of earning $20 and a 25% chance of earning $–10 (losing $10), the expected return would be $7.5:

$$E[R]=R_{1}P_{1} + R_{2}P_{2} + R_{3}P_{3} = 10*0.5 + 20*0.25 + (-10)*0.25 = 7.5.$$

== Discrete scenarios ==
In gambling and probability theory, there is usually a discrete set of possible outcomes. In this case, expected return is a measure of the relative balance of win or loss weighted by their chances of occurring.

For example, if a fair die is thrown and numbers 1 and 2 win $1, but 3-6 lose $0.5, then the expected gain per throw is

$$E[R] = \frac{1}{3} \cdot 1 - \frac{2}{3} \cdot 0.5 = 0.$$

When we calculate the expected return of an investment it allows us to compare it with other opportunities. For example, suppose we have the option of choosing between three mutually exclusive investments: One has a 60% chance of success and if it succeeds it will give a 70% ROR (rate of return). The second investment has a 45% chance of success with a 20% ROR. The third opportunity has an 80% chance of success with a 50% ROR. For each investment, if it is not successful the investor will lose his entire initial investment.

- The expected rate of return for the first investment is (.6 * .7) + (.4 * -1) = 2%
- The expected rate of return for the second investment is (.45 * .2) + (.55 * -1) = -46%
- The expected rate of return for the third investment is (.8 * .5) + (.2 * -1) = 20%

These calculations show that in our scenario the third investment is expected to be the most profitable of the three. The second one even has a negative ROR. This means that if that investment was done an infinite number of times one could expect to lose 46% of the money invested on the average occasion. The formula of expected value is very straightforward, but its value depends on the inputs. The more alternative outcome scenarios that could occur, the more terms are in the equation. As Ilmanen stated,

"The foremost need for multi-dimensional thinking is on inputs. When investors make judgments on the various returns on investments, they should guard against being blinded by past performance and must ensure that they take all or most of the following considerations into account".

- Historical average returns
- Financial and behavioral theories
- Forward looking market indicators such as bond yields; and
- Discretionary views

== Continuous scenarios ==
In economics and finance, it is more likely that the set of possible outcomes is continuous (any numerical value between 0 and infinity). In this case, simplifying assumptions are made about the continuous distribution of possible outcomes.

== See also ==
- Abnormal return
- Expected value
- Rate of return
