= Capital commitment =

Future liability for capital expenditure

Future liability for capital expenditure in respect of which contract have been made.

A Capital Commitment, Committed Capital or simply Commitment, is the agreed capital a General Partner can request (or draw down) from a Limited Partner.

When an investor buys into a Private equity fund, the agreement specifies the total amount the investor commit to the fund. This amount is not requested initially from the Investor, but can be drawn down on request by the General Partner. When the General Partner decides to invest in a portfolio company, it will call, or drawn down some of the commitment.

Over the life of the partnership, the General Partner is not obligated to call the full commitment amount, but cannot call more than what has been committed. If the General Partner does not call the full committed amount, the remainder is called the unfunded commitment.

The commitment amount is part of the Limited Partnership Agreement signed between the Limited Partners and the General Partner. Some clauses of the LPA can refer to the commitment amount, such as:

- The LPA can request an initial contribution, in percentage of the commitment
- The Management fees can be computed in percentage of the commitment, or in percentage of the unfunded commitment
- Most LPAs include a minimum commitment amount
