= Internal rate of return =

Method of calculating an investment's rate of return

Internal rate of return (IRR) is a method of calculating an investment's rate of return. The term internal refers to the fact that the calculation excludes external factors, such as the risk-free rate, inflation, the cost of capital, or financial risk.

The method may be applied either ex-post or ex-ante. Applied ex-ante, the IRR is an estimate of a future annual rate of return. Applied ex-post, it measures the actual achieved investment return of a historical investment.

It is also called the discounted cash flow rate of return (DCFROR) or yield rate.

== Definition ==
The IRR of an investment or project is the "annualized effective compounded return rate" or rate of return that sets the net present value (NPV) of all cash flows (both positive and negative) from the investment equal to zero. Equivalently, it is the interest rate at which the net present value of the future cash flows is equal to the initial investment, and it is also the interest rate at which the total present value of costs (negative cash flows) equals the total present value of the benefits (positive cash flows).

IRR represents the return on investment achieved when a project reaches its breakeven point, meaning that the project is only marginally justified as valuable. When NPV demonstrates a positive value, it indicates that the project is expected to generate value. Conversely, if NPV shows a negative value, the project is expected to lose value. In essence, IRR signifies the rate of return attained when the NPV of the project reaches a neutral state, precisely at the point where NPV breaks even.

IRR accounts for the time preference of money and investments. A given return on investment received at a given time is worth more than the same return received at a later time, so the latter would yield a lower IRR than the former, if all other factors are equal. A fixed income investment in which money is deposited once, interest on this deposit is paid to the investor at a specified interest rate every time period, and the original deposit neither increases nor decreases, would have an IRR equal to the specified interest rate. An investment which has the same total returns as the preceding investment, but delays returns for one or more time periods, would have a lower IRR.

== Uses ==
=== Savings and loans ===
In the context of savings and loans, the IRR is also called the effective interest rate.

=== Profitability of an investment ===
The IRR is an indicator of the profitability, efficiency, quality, or yield of an investment. This is in contrast with the NPV, which is an indicator of the net value or magnitude added by making an investment.

To maximize the value of a business, an investment should be made only if its profitability, as measured by the internal rate of return, is greater than a minimum acceptable rate of return. If the estimated IRR of a project or investment - for example, the construction of a new factory - exceeds the firm's cost of capital invested in that project, the investment is profitable. If the estimated IRR is less than the cost of capital, the proposed project should not be undertaken.

The selection of investments may be subject to budget constraints. There may be mutually exclusive competing projects, or limits on a firm's ability to manage multiple projects. For these reasons, corporations use IRR in capital budgeting to compare the profitability of a set of alternative capital projects. For example, a corporation will compare an investment in a new plant versus an extension of an existing plant based on the IRR of each project. To maximize returns, the higher a project's IRR, the more desirable it is to undertake the project.

There are at least two different ways to measure the IRR for an investment: the project IRR and the equity IRR. The project IRR assumes that the cash flows directly benefit the project, whereas equity IRR considers the returns for the shareholders of the company after the debt has been serviced.

Even though IRR is one of the most popular metrics used to test the viability of an investment and compare returns of alternative projects, looking at the IRR in isolation might not be the best approach for an investment decision. Certain assumptions made during IRR calculations are not always applicable to the investment. In particular, IRR assumes that the project will have either no interim cash flows or the interim cash flows are reinvested into the project which is not always the case. This discrepancy leads to overestimation of the rate of return which might be an incorrect representation of the value of the project.

=== Fixed income ===
IRR is used to evaluate investments in fixed income securities, using metrics such as the yield to maturity and yield to call.

=== Liabilities ===
Both IRR and net present value can be applied to liabilities as well as investments. For a liability, a lower IRR is preferable to a higher one.

=== Capital management ===
Corporations use IRR to evaluate share issues and stock buyback programs. A share repurchase proceeds if returning capital to shareholders has a higher IRR than candidate capital investment projects or acquisition projects at current market prices. Funding new projects by raising new debt may also involve measuring the cost of the new debt in terms of the yield to maturity (internal rate of return).

=== Private equity ===
IRR is also used for private equity, from the limited partners' perspective, as a measure of the general partner's performance as investment manager. This is because it is the general partner who controls the cash flows, including the limited partners' draw-downs of committed capital.

== Calculation ==
Given a collection of pairs (time, cash flow) representing a project, the NPV is a function of the rate of return. The internal rate of return is a rate for which this function is zero, i.e. the internal rate of return is a solution to the equation NPV = 0 (assuming no arbitrage conditions exist).

Given the (period, cash flow) pairs ($n$, $C_n$) where $n$ is a non-negative integer, the total number of periods $N$, and the $\operatorname{NPV}$, (net present value); the internal rate of return is given by $r$ in:

$$\operatorname{NPV} = \sum_{n=0}^N \frac{C_n}{(1+r)^n} = 0$$

This rational polynomial can be converted to an ordinary polynomial having the same roots by substituting g (gain) for $1+r$ and multiplying by $g^N$ to yield the equivalent but simpler condition

$$\sum_{n=0}^N C_ng^{N-n} = 0$$

The possible IRR's are the real values of r satisfying the first condition, and 1 less than the real roots of the second condition (that is, $r = g-1$ for each root g). Note that in both formulas, $C_0$ is the negation of the initial investment at the start of the project while $C_N$ is the cash value of the project at the end, equivalently the cash withdrawn if the project were to be liquidated and paid out so as to reduce the value of the project to zero. In the second condition $C_0$ is the leading coefficient of the ordinary polynomial in g while $C_N$ is the constant term.

The period $n$ is usually given in years, but the calculation may be made simpler if $r$ is calculated using the period in which the majority of the problem is defined (e.g., using months if most of the cash flows occur at monthly intervals) and converted to a yearly period thereafter.

Any fixed time can be used in place of the present (e.g., the end of one interval of an annuity); the value obtained is zero if and only if the NPV is zero.

In the case that the cash flows are random variables, such as in the case of a life annuity, the expected values are put into the above formula.

Often, the value of $r$ that satisfies the above equation cannot be found analytically. In this case, numerical methods or graphical methods must be used.

=== Example ===
If an investment may be given by the sequence of cash flows

Year ($n$)	Cash flow ($C_n$)
0	−123400
1	36200
2	54800
3	48100

then the IRR $r$ is given by

$$\operatorname{NPV} = -123400+\frac{36200}{(1+r)^1} + \frac{54800}{(1+r)^2} + \frac{48100}{(1+r)^3} = 0.$$

In this case, the answer is 5.96% (in the calculation, that is, r = 0.0596).

==== Numerical solution ====
Since the above is a manifestation of the general problem of finding the roots of the equation $\operatorname{NPV}(r)=0$, there are many numerical methods that can be used to estimate $r$. For example, using the secant method, $r$ is given by

$$r_{n+1} = r_n-\operatorname{NPV}_n  \cdot \left(\frac{r_n-r_{n-1}}{\operatorname{NPV}_n-\operatorname{NPV}_{n-1}}\right).$$

where $r_n$ is considered the $n$^{th} approximation of the IRR.

This $r$ can be found to an arbitrary degree of accuracy. Different accounting packages may provide functions for different accuracy levels. For example, Microsoft Excel and Google Sheets have built-in functions to calculate IRR for both fixed and variable time-intervals; "=IRR(...)" and "=XIRR(...)".

The convergence behavior is as follows:

- If the function $\operatorname{NPV}(i)$ has a single real root $r$, then the sequence converges reproducibly towards $r$.
- If the function $\operatorname{NPV}(i)$ has $n$ real roots $\scriptstyle r_1,r_2,\dots,r_n$, then the sequence converges to one of the roots, and changing the values of the initial pairs may change the root to which it converges.
- If function $\operatorname{NPV}(i)$ has no real roots, then the sequence tends towards +∞.

Having $\scriptstyle{r_1 > r_0}$ when $\operatorname{NPV}_0>0$ or $\scriptstyle{r_1 < r_0}$ when $\operatorname{NPV}_0<0$ may speed up convergence of $r_n$ to $r$.

==== Numerical solution for single outflow and multiple inflows ====
Of particular interest is the case where the stream of payments consists of a single outflow, followed by multiple inflows occurring at equal periods. In the above notation, this corresponds to:

$$C_0<0,\quad C_n\ge 0\text{ for }n\ge 1. \,$$

In this case the NPV of the payment stream is a convex, strictly decreasing function of interest rate. There is always a single unique solution for IRR.

Given two estimates $r_1$ and $r_2$ for IRR, the secant method equation (see above) with $n=2$ always produces an improved estimate $r_3$. This is sometimes referred to as the Hit and Trial (or Trial and Error) method. More accurate interpolation formulas can also be obtained: for instance the secant formula with correction

$$r_{n+1} = r_n-\operatorname{NPV}_n\left(\frac{r_n-r_{n-1}}{\operatorname{NPV}_n-\operatorname{NPV}_{n-1}}\right)\left(1 - 1.4 \frac{\operatorname{NPV}_{n-1}}{\operatorname{NPV}_{n-1} - 3\operatorname{NPV}_n + 2C_0} \right),$$

(which is most accurate when $0 > \operatorname{NPV}_n > \operatorname{NPV}_{n-1}$) has been shown to be almost 10 times more accurate than the secant formula for a wide range of interest rates and initial guesses. For example, using the stream of payments {−4000, 1200, 1410, 1875, 1050} and initial guesses $r_1 = 0.25$ and $r_2 = 0.2$ the secant formula with correction gives an IRR estimate of 14.2% (0.7% error) as compared to IRR = 13.2% (7% error) from the secant method.

If applied iteratively, either the secant method or the improved formula always converges to the correct solution.

Both the secant method and the improved formula rely on initial guesses for IRR. The following initial guesses may be used:

$$r_1 = \left( A / |C_0| \right) ^{2/(N+1)} - 1 \,$$

$$r_2 = (1 + r_{1})^p - 1 \,$$

where

$$A = \text{ sum of inflows } = C_1 + \cdots + C_N  \,$$

$$p = \frac{\log(\mathrm{A} / |C_0|)}{\log(\mathrm{A} / \operatorname{NPV}_{1,in})}.$$

Here, $\operatorname{NPV}_{1,in}$ refers to the NPV of the inflows only (that is, set $\mathrm{C}_0 = 0$ and compute NPV).

=== Exact dates of cash flows ===
A cash flow $C_n$ may occur at any time $t_n$ years after the beginning of the project. $t_n$ may not be a whole number. The cash flow should still be discounted by a factor $\frac{1}{(1+r)^{t_{n}}}$. And the formula is

$$\operatorname{NPV} = C_0 + \sum_{n=1}^N \frac{C_n}{(1+r)^{t_n}} = 0$$

For numerical solution we can use Newton's method

$$r_{k+1} = r_k - \frac{\operatorname{NPV}_k}{\operatorname{NPV}'_k}$$

where $\operatorname{NPV}'$ is the derivative of $\operatorname{NPV}$ and given by

$$\operatorname{NPV}' = -\sum_{n=1}^N \frac{C_n \cdot t_n}{(1+r)^{t_n+1}}$$

An initial value $r_1$ can be given by

$$r_1 = \frac{-1}{C_0} \sum_{n=1}^N C_n - 1$$

== Problems with use ==
=== Comparison with NPV investment selection criterion ===
As a tool applied to making an investment decision on whether a project adds value or not, comparing the IRR of a single project with the required rate of return, in isolation from any other projects, is equivalent to the NPV method. If the appropriate IRR (if such can be found correctly) is greater than the required rate of return, using the required rate of return to discount cash flows to their present value, the NPV of that project will be positive, and vice versa. However, using IRR to sort projects in order of preference does not result in the same order as using NPV.

=== Maximizing NPV ===
One possible investment objective is to maximize the total NPV of projects.

When the objective is to maximize total value, the calculated IRR should not be used to choose between mutually exclusive projects.

NPV vs discount rate comparison for two mutually exclusive projects. Project 'A' has a higher NPV (for certain discount rates), even though its IRR (= x-axis intercept) is lower than for project 'B' (click to enlarge)

In cases where one project has a higher initial investment than a second mutually exclusive project, the first project may have a lower IRR (expected return), but a higher NPV (increase in shareholders' wealth) and should thus be accepted over the second project (assuming no capital constraints).

When the objective is to maximize total value, IRR should not be used to compare projects of different duration. For example, the NPV added by a project with longer duration but lower IRR could be greater than that of a project of similar size, in terms of total net cash flows, but with shorter duration and higher IRR.

=== Practitioner preference for IRR over NPV ===
Despite a strong academic preference for NPV, surveys indicate that executives prefer IRR over NPV. Apparently, managers prefer to compare investments of different sizes in terms of forecast investment performance, using IRR, rather than maximize value to the firm, in terms of NPV. This preference makes a difference when comparing mutually exclusive projects.

=== Maximizing long-term return ===
Maximizing total value is not the only conceivable possible investment objective. An alternative objective would for example be to maximize long-term return. Such an objective would rationally lead to accepting first those new projects within the capital budget which have the highest IRR, because adding such projects would tend to maximize overall long-term return.

==== Example ====
To see this, consider two investors, Max Value and Max Return. Max Value wishes her net worth to grow as large as possible, and will invest every last cent available to achieve this, whereas Max Return wants to maximize his rate of return over the long term, and would prefer to choose projects with smaller capital outlay but higher returns. Max Value and Max Return can each raise up to 100,000 US dollars from their bank at an annual interest rate of 10 percent paid at the end of the year.

Investors Max Value and Max Return are presented with two possible projects to invest in, called Big-Is-Best and Small-Is-Beautiful. Big-Is-Best requires a capital investment of 100,000 US dollars today, and the lucky investor will be repaid 132,000 US dollars in a year's time. Small-Is-Beautiful only requires 10,000 US dollars capital to be invested today, and will repay the investor 13,750 US dollars in a year's time.

===== Solution =====
The cost of capital for both investors is 10 percent.

Both Big-Is-Best and Small-Is-Beautiful have positive NPVs:

$$\operatorname{NPV}(\text{Big-Is-Best}) = \frac{132,000}{1.1} - 100,000 = 20,000$$
$$\operatorname{NPV}(\text{Small-Is-Beautiful}) = \frac{13,750}{1.1} - 10,000 = 2,500$$

and the IRR of each is (of course) greater than the cost of capital:

$$\mathit{NPV}(\text{Big-Is-Best}) = \frac{132,000}{1.32} - 100,000 = 0$$

so the IRR of Big-Is-Best is 32 percent, and

$$\operatorname{NPV}(\text{Small-Is-Beautiful}) = \frac{13,750}{1.375} - 10,000 = 0$$

so the IRR of Small-Is-Beautiful is 37.5 percent.

Both investments would be acceptable to both investors, but the twist in the tale is that these are mutually exclusive projects for both investors, because their capital budget is limited to 100,000 US dollars. How will the investors choose rationally between the two?

As an example, Max Value selects Big-Is-Best, which has the higher net present value of US$20,000, while Max Return selects Small-Is-Beautiful for its higher return of 37.5 percent, compared to the 32 percent return offered by Big-Is-Best. The result is that each decision-maker chooses a different project without conflict.

The rationality of this decision stems from the fact that the investors do not have to invest the full 100,000 US dollars. Max Return is content to invest only 10,000 US dollars for now. Max Return may rationalize the outcome by thinking that maybe tomorrow there will be new opportunities available to invest the remaining 90,000 US dollars at higher IRRs. Max Value is also happy, because she has filled her capital budget straight away, and decides she can take the rest of the year off investing.

=== Multiple IRRs ===
When the sign of the cash flows changes more than once, for example when positive cash flows are followed by negative ones and then by positive ones (+ + − − − +), the IRR may have multiple real values. In a series of cash flows like (−10, 21, −11), one initially invests money, so a high rate of return is best, but then receives more than one possesses, so then one owes money, so now a low rate of return is best. In this case, it is not even clear whether a high or a low IRR is better.

There may even be multiple real IRRs for a single project, like in the example 0% as well as 10%. Examples of this type of project are strip mines and nuclear power plants, where there is usually a large cash outflow at the end of the project.

The IRR satisfies a polynomial equation. Sturm's theorem can be used to determine if that equation has a unique real solution. In general the IRR equation cannot be solved analytically but only by iteration.

With multiple internal rates of return, the IRR approach can still be interpreted in a way that is consistent with the present value approach if the underlying investment stream is correctly identified as net investment or net borrowing.

See for a way of identifying the relevant IRR from a set of multiple IRR solutions.

=== Limitations in the context of private equity ===
In the context of survivorship bias which makes the high IRR of large private equity firms a poor representation of the average, according to Ludovic Phalippou,

"...a headline figure that is often shown prominently as a rate of return in presentations and documents is, in fact, an IRR. IRRs are not rates of return. Something large PE firms have in common is that their early investments did well. These early winners have set up those firms' since-inception IRR at an artificially sticky and high level. The mathematics of IRR means that their IRRs will stay at this level forever, as long as the firms avoid major disasters. In passing, this generates some stark injustice because it is easier to game IRRs on LBOs in Western countries than in any other PE investments. That means that the rest of the PE industry (e.g. emerging market growth capital) is sentenced to look relatively bad forever, for no reason other than the use of a game-able performance metric."

Also,

"Another problem with the presentation of pension fund performance is that for PE, time-weighted returns...are not the most pertinent measure of performance. Asking how much pension funds gave and got back in dollar terms from PE, i.e. MoM, would be more pertinent. I went through the largest 15 funds websites to collect information on their performance. Few of them post their PE fund returns online. In most cases, they post information on their past performance in PE, but nothing that enables any meaningful benchmarking. E.g., CalSTRS [a California public pension fund] provide only the net IRR for each fund they invest in. As IRR is often misleading and can never be aggregated or compared to stock-market returns, such information is basically useless for gauging performance."

=== Modified internal rate of return ===
Modified internal rate of return (MIRR) considers cost of capital, and is intended to provide a better indication of a project's probable return. It applies a discount rate for borrowing cash, and the IRR is calculated for the investment cash flows. This applies in real life for example when a customer makes a deposit before a specific machine is built.

When a project has multiple IRRs it may be more convenient to compute the IRR of the project with the benefits reinvested. Accordingly, MIRR is used, which has an assumed reinvestment rate, usually equal to the project's cost of capital.

=== Average internal rate of return (AIRR) ===
Magni (2010) introduced a new approach, named AIRR approach, based on the intuitive notion of mean, that solves the problems of the IRR. However, the above-mentioned difficulties are only some of the many flaws incurred by the IRR. Magni (2013) provided a detailed list of 18 flaws of the IRR and showed how the AIRR approach does not incur the IRR problems.

== Mathematics ==
Mathematically, the value of the investment is assumed to undergo exponential growth or decay according to some rate of return (any value greater than −100%), with discontinuities for cash flows, and the IRR of a series of cash flows is defined as any rate of return that results in a NPV of zero (or equivalently, a rate of return that results in the correct value of zero after the last cash flow).

Thus, internal rate(s) of return follow from the NPV as a function of the rate of return. This function is continuous. Towards a rate of return of −100% the NPV approaches infinity with the sign of the last cash flow, and towards a rate of return of positive infinity the NPV approaches the first cash flow (the one at the present). Therefore, if the first and last cash flow have a different sign there exists an IRR. Examples of time series without an IRR:

- Only negative cash flows — the NPV is negative for every rate of return.
- (−1, 1, −1), rather small positive cash flow between two negative cash flows; the NPV is a quadratic function of 1/(1 + r), where r is the rate of return, or put differently, a quadratic function of the discount rate r/(1 + r); the highest NPV is −0.75, for r = 100%.

In the case of a series of exclusively negative cash flows followed by a series of exclusively positive ones, the resulting function of the rate of return is continuous and monotonically decreasing from positive infinity (when the rate of return approaches −100%) to the value of the first cash flow (when the rate of return approaches infinity), so there is a unique rate of return for which it is zero. Hence, the IRR is also unique (and equal). Although the NPV-function itself is not necessarily monotonically decreasing on its whole domain, it is at the IRR.

Similarly, in the case of a series of exclusively positive cash flows followed by a series of exclusively negative ones the IRR is also unique.

Finally, by Descartes' rule of signs, the number of internal rates of return can never be more than the number of changes in sign of cash flow.

== The reinvestment debate ==
It is often stated that IRR assumes reinvestment of all cash flows until the very end of the project. This assertion has been a matter of debate in the literature.

Sources stating that there is such a hidden assumption have been cited below. Other sources have argued that there is no IRR reinvestment assumption.

To understand the source of this confusion let's consider an example with a 3-year bond of $1000 face value and coupon rate of 5% (or $50).

	Future value, coupons redeemed				Future value, coupons reinvested			
	Starting balance	Interest, 5%	Cash in/out	Ending balance	Starting balance	Interest, 5%	Cash in/out	Ending balance
Investment			−1000				−1000	
1st year coupon	1000	50	50	1000	1000	50	0	1050
2nd year coupon	1000	50	50	1000	1050	52.5	0	1102.5
3rd year coupon + bond	1000	50	1050	0	1102.5	55.125	1157.625	0
Total return			150				157.625	
IRR			5%				5%	

As can be seen, although the total return is different the IRR is still the same. Put in other words, IRR is neutral to reinvestments made at the same rate. No matter whether the cash is taken out early or reinvested at the same rate and taken out late - the rate is the same.

To understand why, we need to calculate the present value (PV) of our future cash flows, effectively reproducing IRR calculations manually:

	Coupons redeemed			Coupons reinvested		
	Cash in/out	PV formula	PV	Cash in/out	PV formula	PV
Investment	−1000	−1000 / (1+5%)^{0}	−1000	−1000	−1000 / (1+5%)^{0}	−1000
1st year coupon	50	50 / (1+5%)^{1}	47.62	0	0 / (1+5%)^{1}	0
2nd year coupon	50	50 / (1+5%)^{2}	45.35	0	0 / (1+5%)^{2}	0
3rd year coupon + bond	1050	1050 / (1+5%)^{3}	907.03	1157.625	1157.625 / (1+5%)^{3}	1000
Total return	150		0	157.625		0

== In personal finance ==
The IRR can be used to measure the money-weighted performance of financial investments such as an individual investor's brokerage account. For this scenario, an equivalent, more intuitive definition of the IRR is, "The IRR is the annual interest rate of the fixed rate account (like a somewhat idealized savings account) which, when subjected to the same deposits and withdrawals as the actual investment, has the same ending balance as the actual investment." This fixed rate account is also called the replicating fixed rate account for the investment. There are examples where the replicating fixed rate account encounters negative balances despite the fact that the actual investment did not. In those cases, the IRR calculation assumes that the same interest rate that is paid on positive balances is charged on negative balances. It has been shown that this way of charging interest is the root cause of the IRR's multiple solutions problem. If the model is modified so that, as is the case in real life, an externally supplied cost of borrowing (possibly varying over time) is charged on negative balances, the multiple solutions issue disappears. The resulting rate is called the fixed rate equivalent (FREQ).

== Unannualized internal rate of return ==
In the context of investment performance measurement, there is sometimes ambiguity in terminology between the periodic rate of return, such as the IRR as defined above, and a holding period return. The term internal rate of return (IRR) or Since Inception Internal Rate of Return (SI-IRR) is in some contexts used to refer to the unannualized return over the period, particularly for periods of less than a year.

== See also ==
- Accounting rate of return
- Capital budgeting
- Modified Dietz method
- Modified internal rate of return
- Time-weighted return
- Simple Dietz method
- Marginal efficiency of capital
- Return on investment
