= Simple Dietz method =

Means of measuring historical investment portfolio performance

The simple Dietz method is a means of measuring historical investment portfolio performance, compensating for external flows into/out of the portfolio during the period. The formula for the simple Dietz return is as follows:

$$R=\frac{B - A - C}{A +C/2}$$

where

$R$ is the portfolio rate of return,
$A$ is the beginning market value,
$B$ is the ending market value, and
$C$ is the net external inflow during the period (flows out of the portfolio are negative and flows into the portfolio are positive).

It is based on the assumption that all external flows occur at the half-way point in time within the evaluation period (or are spread evenly across the period, and so the flows occur on average at the middle of the period).

== Fees ==
To measure returns net of fees, allow the value of the portfolio to be reduced by the amount of the fees. To calculate returns gross of fees, compensate for them by treating them as an external flow, and exclude accrued fees from valuations, i.e. do not reduce the portfolio market value by the fee amount accrued.

== Discussion ==
1. The simple Dietz method is a variation upon the simple rate of return, which assumes that external flows occur either at the beginning or at the end of the period. The simple Dietz method is somewhat more computationally tractable than the internal rate of return (IRR) method.
2. A refinement of the simple Dietz method is the modified Dietz method, which takes available information on the actual timing of external flows into consideration.
3. Like the modified Dietz method, the simple Dietz method is based on the assumption of a simple rate of return principle, unlike the internal rate of return method, which applies a compounding principle.
4. Also like the modified Dietz method, it is a money-weighted returns method (as opposed to a time-weighted returns method). In particular, if the simple Dietz returns on two portfolios over the same period are $R_1$ and $R_2$, then the simple Dietz return on the combined portfolio containing the two portfolios is the weighted average of the simple Dietz return on the two individual portfolios: $R = w_1 \times R_1 + w_2 \times R_2$. The weights $w_1$ and $w_2$ are given by: $w_i = \frac{A_i +\frac{C_i}{2}}{A_1 + A_2 +\frac{C_1+C_2}{2}}$.

== Derivation ==
The method is named after Peter O. Dietz. According to his book Pension Funds: Measuring Investment Performance,

"The method selected to measure return on investment is similar to the one described by Hilary L. Seal in Trust and Estate magazine. This measure is used by most insurance companies and by the SEC in compiling return on investment in its Pension Bulletins. The basis of this measure is to find a rate of return by dividing income by one-half the beginning investment plus one-half the ending investment, minus one-half the investment income. Thus where A equals beginning investment, B equals ending investment, and I equals income, return R is equivalent to

$$R = I \div {1/2}  (A + B - I)$$

For the purpose of measuring pension fund investment performance, income should be defined to include ordinary income plus realized and unrealized gains and losses."
"The investment base to be used is market value as opposed to book value. There are several reasons for this choice: First, market value represents the true economic value which is available to the investment manager at any point in time, whereas book value is arbitrary. Book value depends on the timing of investments, that is, book value will be high or low depending on when investments were made. Second, an investment manager who realizes capital gains will increase his investment base as opposed to a manager who lets his gains ride, even though the funds have the same economic value. Such action would result in an artificially lower return for the fund realizing gains and reinvesting if book value were used."

Using $M_1$ and $M_2$ for beginning and ending market value respectively, he then uses the following relation:

$$M_2 = {M_1} + C + I$$

to transform

$$R = I \div {1/2}  ({M_1} + {M_2} - I)$$

into

$$R=\frac{{M_2} - {M_1} - C}{{1/2}({M_1} + {M_2} - {M_2} + {M_1} + C)}$$

hence

$$R=\frac{{M_2} - {M_1} - C}{{M_1} + C/2}$$

He goes on to rearrange this into:

$${M_2} = {M_1} + C + {RM_1} + RC/2$$

This formula

"reveals that the market value at the end of any period must be equal to the beginning market value plus net contributions plus the rate of return earned of the assets in the fund at the beginning of the period and the return earned on one-half of the contributions. This assumes contributions are received midway through each investment period, and alternately, that half the contributions are received at the beginning of the period, and half at the end of the period."

== See also ==
- Internal rate of return
- Modified Dietz method
- Rate of return
